The 1919 New Year Honours were appointments by lord George V to various orders and honours to reward and highlight good works by citizens of the British Empire. The appointments were published in The London Gazette and The Times in January 1919.

Distinguished Conduct Medal (DCM) 

For distinguished service in connection with Military Operations with the Armies in Salonika:
Battery Sergeant Major S. A. Long, C/114th Brigade, Royal Field Artillery (Manor Park)
Sergeant R. J. Wildman, 9th S. Battalion, Royal Lancaster Regiment (Lancaster)

For distinguished services in connection with Military Operations with the British Forces in Egypt:
Company Sergeant Major E. Addicott, 3rd Battalion, Royal Berkshire Regiment, attd. 1st British West Indies Regiment (Halland)
Signaller Corporal H. Armour, 18th Brigade, Royal Horse Artillery (Ayr)
Sergeant W. J. Barnes, 85th Field Company, Royal Engineers (Dublin)
Sergeant M. E. Barrett, 1/B. Battery, Honourable Artillery Company, attd. 19th Brigade, Royal Horse Artillery (U. Clapton, London)
Driver P. R. Beart, 54th Division, Royal Army Service Corps (Willesden Gn.)
Sergeant F. Bloomfield, 1/4th Battalion, Norfolk Regiment (Thetford)
Sergeant A. E. Bolt, No. 8 Company, Imperial Camel Corps (Weymouth)
Driver M. Burke, 1/3rd (Lowland) Brigade, Royal Field Artillery, attd. B. Battery, 262nd Brigade, Royal Field Artillery (Glasgow)
Sergeant Major B. Clark, 8th Battalion, Hampshire Regiment (Sandown)
Sergeant R. Clark, 1/5th Battalion, Suffolk Regiment (Cavendish, Suff.)
Company Sergeant Major G. Clement, 1st Battalion, North Staffordshire Regiment, attd. 2nd Battalion, British West Indies Regiment (Nordon)
Corporal R. T. Coles, Royal Engineers, attd. 20th Indian Infantry Brigade Sub-Sec. (Ampthill)
Corporal T. S. Crawford, 96th Lieutenant Railway Company, Royal Engineers (Walpole, Norfolk)
Battery Quartermaster Sergeant A. W. Davies, 1/4th Battalion Essex Regiment (Plaistow)
Sergeant J. A. Denman, Nottinghamshire Yeomanry (Retford)
Corporal A. Drury, 1/5th Battalion, Essex Regiment (Castle Hedingham)
Private R. Dunn, No. 7 Company, Imperial Camel Corps (Dundee)
Sergeant W. Dunne, 1st Battalion, Royal Irish Regiment (Dublin)
Sergeant T. Field, 1/5th Battalion, Somerset Light Infantry (Taunton)
Sergeant E. H. Forster, Royal Army Medical Corps, attd. 154th Indian Com. Field Ambulance (Weaste, Salford)
Sergeant C. H. Foster, 1/5th Battalion, Welsh Regiment (Bedlinog, via Cardiff)
Corporal J. Freeman, No. 10 Company, Imperial Camel Corps (Hull)
Private E. French, Royal Army Veterinary Corps, attd. 1/1st (Somerset) Royal Horse Artillery (West Porlock)
Farrier Quartermaster/Sergeant T. H. Gabb, Gloucestershire Yeomanry (Gloucester)
Company Sergeant Major A. W. Gibbs, 1/10th Battalion, London Regiment (Stamford Hill)
Battery Sergeant Major H. B. Goddard, 2/67th Divisional Ammunition Column, Royal Field Artillery (Eastleigh)
Corporal D. Grant, 98th Lieutenant Railway Company, Royal Engineers (Avermore, Inverness)
Lance Corporal W. V. Greening, No. 8 Company, Imperial Camel Corps (Southampton)
Sergeant K. Grimes, 91st Heavy Battery, Royal Garrison Artillery (Cricklewood)
Corporal J. G. Groom, 13th Pont. Park, Royal Engineers (Middlesbotrough)
Corporal R. Hallows, 67th Brigade, Royal Field Artillery (Liverpool)
Sergeant P. W. Hammond, 1/1st Dorsetshire Yeomanry (Dorchester)
Fitter Staff Sergeant E. P. Hawks, 304th Siege Battery, Royal Garrison Artillery (Westminster)
Sergeant A. W. Hermon, No. 8 Company, Imperial Camel Corps (Reading)
Sergeant W. F. Hethershaw, Nottinghamshire Yeomanry (Retford)
Sapper J. K. Higgins, Royal Engineers (Shettleston)
Staff Sergeant Major E. Hope, 19th Machine Gun Squadron, Cavalry Machine Gun Corps (Brighton)
Battery Sergeant Major J. Humphries, 1/2nd (Herts.) Battery, Royal Field Artillery, attd. A. Battery, 270th Brigade, Royal Field Artillery (Watford)
Sergeant W. J. Inman, 3rd Battalion, Royal Berkshire Regiment, attd. 2nd Battalion, British West Indies Regiment (Reading)
Company Sergeant Major F. James, 1/5tfh Battalion, Essex Regiment (South Twickenham)
Private T. James, 2nd Battalion, Royal Highlanders (Edmondsley)
Sergeant C. E. Jeffries, 119th A. Air Section, Royal Garrison Artillery (Tunbridge Wells)
Sergeant L. F. Kerswell, 11th Cavalry Brigade, Signal Troop, Royal Engineers (Brondesbury Bark)
Corporal G. T. Knight, 1/5th Battalion, Somerset Light Infantry (Highbridge)
Sergeant V. L. Lamplugh, No. 8 Company, Imperial Camel Corps (Hull)
Sergeant W. H. Langlois, 2/19th Battalion, London Regiment (Kensal Rise)
Sergeant T. Leadbetter, 54th Division, Machine Gun Battalion (Smethwick)
Company Sergeant Major C. H. Leake, 1/5th Battalion, Norfolk Regiment (East Runton)
Sergeant H. Letts, 1/4th Battalion, Northamptonshire Regiment (Rushden)
Private T. Lewis, 2nd Battalion, Leicestershire Regiment (Leicester)
Sergeant A. D. Lindsay, 390th Battery, 37th Brigade, Royal Field Artillery (East Ham)
Company Sergeant Major T. Lloyd, 436th Field Company, Royal Engineers T.F. (Llanelly)
Lance Corporal C. Lye, 1/1st Dorsetshire Yeomanry (Trowbridge)
Corporal W. McEvoy, 3/4th (West Lancaster) How. Brigade, Royal Field Artillery, attd. No. 5 M.M. Battery. (Putney, London)
Private D. McWalter, 2/1st (Ang.) Field Ambulance, Royal Army Medical Corps (Dundee)
Corporal H. J. Mead, 521st Field Company, Royal Engineers (Battersea)
Sergeant J. T. Milliard, 1/1st Staffordshire Yeomanry (Brockmoor, Staffs.)
Regimental Sergeant Major A. Morgan, 12th Lancers, attd. 1/5th Battalion, Royal Welsh Fusiliers (Dumfries)
Sergeant T. G. Morgan, 2nd Battalion, HQ Company, Imperial Camel Corps (Pembroke)
Lance Corporal H. Morns, 54th Division Machine Gun Battalion (Paddington)
Lance Sergeant W. A. Murray, No. 7 Company, Imperial Camel Corps (Prestwick)
Sapper J. Nicol, 521st Field Company, Royal Engineers (U. Kennington Lane)
Signaller Corporal R. Old, 406th Battery, 172nd Brigade, Royal Field Artillery (Farnborough, Hampshire.)
Sapper A. Ottoway, 7th Field Survey Company, Royal Engineers (Hildenborougth)
Battery Sergeant Major W. Parker, No. 2 Section, 53rd Divisional Ammunition Column, Royal Field Artillery (Sheffield)
Fitter Staff Sergeant G. A. Phillipson, 1/1st (Essex) Battery, Royal Field Artillery, attd. A. Battery, 271st Brigade, Royal Field Artillery (Manor Park)
Battery Sergeant Major H. G. Pollard, A. Battery, 265th Brigade, Royal Field Artillery (Chester)
Sergeant W. E. Pratt, 1/6th Battalion, Essex Regiment, attd. 161st Light Trench Mortar Battery (Plaistow)
Bombardier P. Quinnell, Royal Field Artillery, attd. No. 5 M.M. Battery. (Rainham)
Sapper J. Richardson, 7th Field Survey Company, Royal Engineers (Wealdstone, Harrow)
Company Sergeant Major A. Gr. Ricketts, 2nd Battalion, Dorsetshire Regiment (Yeovil)
Private J. Rochford, 1st Battalion, Connaught Rangers (Clare)
Sergeant S. Rose, 10th Signal Company, Royal Engineers (Limerick)
Sergeant G. A. Ross, Royal Engineers Cable Section, Royal Engineers (Sidmouth June.)
Sergeant J. Ross, 1/3rd (Lowland) Brigade, Royal Field Artillery, attd. A. Battery, 262nd Brigade, Royal Field Artillery (Clydebank)
Private C. Ryder, 75th Division, Machine Gun Battalion (Barrowford)
Battery Quartermaster Sergeant L. Schwarz, 5/6th Battalion, Royal Welsh Fusiliers (Holywell)
Sergeant T. G. Shepherd, 2/22nd Battalion, London Regiment (Bermondsey)
Battery Sergeant Major J. Shields, Royal Field Artillery, attd. A. Battery, 302nd Brigade, Royal Field Artillery (Kirkcaldy)
Sergeant W. E. S. Taylor, 1/2nd (South Midland) Mounted Brigade, Field Ambulance, Royal Army Medical Corps, attd. 10th Cavalry Brigade, Com. Field Ambulance (Stony Stratford)
Sergeant J. H. Vaughan, 53rd Machine Gun Battalion (Welshpool)
Private C. H. Wakeman, King's Royal Rifle Corps, posted 2/13th Battalion, London Regiment (Nutfield)
Corporal F. J. Watts, No. 6 (Pack) Wireless Sec., Royal Engineers (Finchley)
Corporal A. W. Western, 2/22nd Battalion, London Regiment, attd. 181st Light Trench Mortar Battery (New Cross)
Company Sergeant Major W. H. Williams, 437th Field Company, Royal Engineers (E. Griffithstown)
Private E. Wise, 1/1st Nottinghamshire Yeomanry (Poplar, London)
Sergeant H. V. Wodhams, 75th Battery, 263rd Brigade, Royal Field Artillery (Freshwater)
Sergeant W. C. Worthing, 1/1st Battalion, Herefordshire Regiment (Rhayader)
Sapper T. W. Yardy, 96th Lieutenant Railway Company, Royal Engineers (Knobtingley)
Sergeant J. E. Yates, 54th Divisional Signals Company, Royal Engineers
Australian Imperial Force
Sergeant F. J. Allen, 2nd Australian Light Horse Regiment
Signaller A. Baldwin, 2nd Australian Light Horse Regiment
Lance Corporal F. Bell, D Trps. and Bdg. Trn., Australian Engineers
Lance Corporal S. E. Broad, 3rd Australian Machine Gun Squadron
Trooper J. Brunton, 12th Australian Light Horse Regiment
Sergeant J. E. Chapman, Sth Australian Light Horse Regiment
Farrier Quartermaster/Sergeant A. W. Cook. 5th Australian Light Horse Regiment
Lance Corporal C. W. S. Cooper, 11th Australian Light Horse Regiment
Sergeant J. Fitzmaurice, 10th Australian Light Horse Regiment
Corporal W. Gray, 3rd Australian Light Horse Regiment
Corporal R. E. Haseler, 14th Australian Light Horse Regiment
Sergeant F. A. Kolosque, 4th Australian Machine Gun Squadron
Lance Corporal W. J. Langdon, 10th Australian Light Horse Regiment
Signaller S. McCallum, 14th Australian Light Horse Regiment
Staff Sergeant Major L. W. McDonald, 1st Field Squadron Australian Engineers
Lance Corporal H. R. Y. McGuigan, 1st Field Squadron, Australian Engineers
Signaller Sergeant E. E. McHugh, 4th Australian Light Horse Regiment
Private G. B. G. Maitland, 4th Australian Light Horse Regiment
Sergeant W. C. Martin, 10th Australian Light Horse Regiment
Sergeant H. E. Monaghan, 1st Field Squadron, Australian Engineers
Staff Sergeant L. A. Patterson, Australian Mounted Division Trn
Corporal A. P. Pearson, Australian Light Horse Details
Staff Sergeant Major T. L. Pringle, Australian and New Zealand Mounted Division
Corporal H. E. Runn, 9th Australian Light Horse Regiment
Staff Sergeant Major P. P. Sheridan, 6th Australian Light Horse Regiment
Corporal W. A. G. Smith, 7th Australian Light Horse Regiment
Lance Corporal W. W. Willis, 8th Australian Light Horse Regiment
New Zealand Force
Sergeant L. Burrows, Canterbury Mounted Rifles Regiment
South African Force
Regimental Sergeant Major W. Baker, 1st South African Field Artillery Brigade

In recognition of valuable services rendered with the British Forces in Italy:
Company Sergeant Major J. Ashworth  24th Battalion (P), Manchester Regiment (Oldham)
Company Sergeant Major J. Betts, 11th Battalion, Nottinghamshire and Derbyshire Regiment (Burton-on-Trent)
Private G. Brayley, 8th Battalion, Devonshire Regiment (S. Molton, Devon)
Sergeant F. E. Brumell, 19th Heavy Battery, Royal Garrison Artillery (Belvedere)
Sergeant F. Cattell, 1/7th Battalion, Royal Warwickshire Regiment (Leamington Spa)
Company Sergeant Major A. Clarke, 2nd Battalion, Royal Warwickshire Regiment (Warwick)
Sergeant J. J. Cosnett, 105th Battery, 22nd Brigade, Royal Field Artillery (Solihull, Birmingham)
Private J. H. Cox, 9th Battalion, South Staffordshire Regiment (Walsall)
Company Sergeant Major G. E. Dent, 8th Battalion, Yorkshire Regiment (Sheffield)
Gunner R. W. Donnan, B Battery, 102nd Brigade, Royal Field Artillery (Castlebellingham)
Sergeant R. Everson  10th Battalion, West Riding Regiment (Shipley)
Company Sergeant Major J. Goodieson, 9th Battalion, Yorkshire Regiment (Middlesbrough)
Sergeant A. Hamilton, 7th Battalion, Machine Gun Corps (Motberwell)
Bombardier B. Hawkeswood, C Battery, 241st (South Midland) Brigade, Royal Field Artillery (Kedditch)
Lance Bombardier R. Hunt, 155th Heavy Battery, Royal Garrison Artillery (Stockport)
Battery Sergeant Major C. Jarman, D Battery, 103rd Brigade, Royal Field Artillery (E. Chatham)
Company Sergeant Major A. H. Laidler, 1/4th Battalion, Royal Berkshire Regiment (Newbury)
Sergeant W. Longmore, 1/6th Battalion, Royal Warwickshire Regiment (Birmingham)
Private C. Oliver, 23rd Division MT. Company, Royal Army Service Corps, attd. 69th Field Ambulance Royal Army Medical Corps (Potters Bar)
Corporal A. J. Oyler, 5th Battalion (P), Royal Sussex Regiment (Rye)
Private H. G. A. Pike, 1/5th Battalion, Gloucestershire Regiment (Cheltenham)
Gunner G. Reddick, A. Battery, 103rd Brigade, Royal Field Artillery (Leatherhead)
Regimental Sergeant Major A. Robson  8th Battalion, Yorkshire Regiment (Seaton)
Corporal F. H. S. Royals, 1/7th Battalion, Worcestershire Regiment (Kidderminster)
Lance Corporal T. F. Salmon, 2nd Battalion, Royal West Surrey Regiment (Southwark Bridge Road, London)
Private W. Shepherd, 2nd Battalion, Gordon Highlanders (Oakley)
Private J. Southall, 1st Battalion, South Staffordshire Regiment (Dudley)
Sergeant W. J. Treadwell, 289tli Siege Battery, Royal Garrison Artillery (Lightborne, near Warwick)
Sapper P. Tunnicliff, 6th Field Sur. Company, Royal Engineers (Coventry)
Sergeant J. S. Wright, 1/1st (War.) Heavy Battery, Royal Garrison Artillery (Birmingham)

In recognition of valuable services rendered with the British Forces in Italy:
Gunner H. Aitken, Royal Field Artillery, attd. 102nd Brigade (Stranraer)
Private O. E. R. Alexander, Honourable Artillery Company, 2nd Battalion (Stoke-on-Trent)
Private W. Allan, Royal Army Service Corps, 3rd Corps F.S.C. (Kilmarnock), 
Company Quartermaster Sergeant A. Allen, Worcestershire Regiment, 8th Battalion (Worcester)
Sergeant C. Atkinson, Royal Engineers, 5 Pontoon Park (Blackburn)
2nd Corporal J. Austin, Royal Engineers, 5 Pontoon Park (Ladywood)
Bombardier R. Bacon, Royal Field Artillery, B/102nd Brigade (Buxton)
Sergeant W. Baker, Royal Field Artillery, 48th Divisional Artillery Column (Bristol.)
Sergeant H. J. Bannister, Royal Sussex Regiment, 5th Battalion (Rye)
Sergeant Major W. J. Barber, Manchester Regiment, 21st Battalion (London)
Private A. Barker, Royal Army Service Corps, 14th Corps, FS.C. (Rochester)
Sergeant R. Batey, Royal Field Artillery, 58th Battery (Silvertown, TP)
Sergeant G. Beateon, Royal Garrison Artillery, Horse Artillery (E. Leeds)
Company Quartermaster Sergeant M.C. Bell, York & Lancaster Regiment, 8th Battalion (Sacriston)
Private W. Bell, Manchester Regiment, 20th Battalion (Stockport)
Sergeant S. G. Bennett, East Kent Regiment, 7th Battalion (Finsbury Park)
Quartermaster Sergeant W. J. Benning, Oxfordshire & Buckinghamshire Light Infantry, 1st Buckinghamshire Battalion (Cheshain)
Sergeant C. Blackwell, Royal Warwickshire Regiment, 5th Battalion (Bromsgrove)
Private J. S. Bolam, Northumberland Fusiliers, 11th Battalion (Newcastle upon Tyne)
Corporal W. Bostock, Royal Engineers, Signal Company (Hanley)
Corporal D. W. Bowen, Royal Army Service Corps, Headquarters, 23rd Division (Carmarthen)
Company Quartermaster Sergeant F. J. Boyce, West Yorkshire Regiment, 11th Battalion (Sheffield)
Sapper W. Brennan, Royal Engineers, 54th Field Company (Woolwich)
Sergeant J. T. Bridges, Royal Engineers, L. of C. Signal Company (Gillingham)
Company Quartermaster Sergeant R. Brown, Border Regiment, 2nd Battalion (Oreston)
Corporal R. Browning, Royal Sussex Regiment, 5th Battalion (East Grinstead)
Colour Sergeant F. B. J. Buck, Machine Gun Corps, 7th Battalion (Waterfoot)
Quartermaster Sergeant E. H. Buhner, Nottinghamshire and Derbyshire Regiment, 11th Battalion (Fleetwood)
Sergeant G. E. J. Bushnell, Royal Army Medical Corps, 71st Field Ambulance (Chelsea)
Sergeant H. Butler, Royal Engineers, Signal Company (Reading)
Sergeant A. Cadd  Royal Field Artillery, attd. 103rd Brigade (Glodwick)
Fitter F. J. Calvert, Royal Garrison Artillery, 293rd Siege Battery (Southend-on-Sea)
Corporal W. Campbell, Gloucestershire Regiment, 6th Battalion (Bristol)
Quartermaster Sergeant R. A. Campbell, Manchester Regiment, 20th Battalion (Manchester)
Private W. C. Cannon, Royal Fusiliers (London), 
Company Sergeant Major M. Capelen  Royal Welsh Fusiliers, 1st Battalion (Wrexham)
Corporal E. J. W. Champion, Royal Army Medical Corps, 3rd (S Mid.) Field Ambulance (Poole)
Private S. C. Chant, Royal Army Service Corps, Headquarters, 4th Corps (Martock), 
Driver T. Cheesmore, Royal Engineers, 7th D.S. Company (Pensnurst)
Company Sergeant Major J. A. Christie, Machine Gun Corps, 7th Battalion (Aberdeen)
Company Quartermaster Sergeant G. Claytor, Nottinghamshire and Derbyshire Regiment, 11th Battalion (Chesterfield)
Private T. Clough, Army Gymnastic Staff, Central School, Spennymoor, 
Company Sergeant Major W. Coleman, Yorkshire Regiment, 9th Battalion (Eston, Yorkshire), 
Company Sergeant Major A. S. Cook, Army Cyclist Corps, 14th Cyclist Battalion (Kensal Rise)
Sergeant W. Cooke, Royal Warwickshire Regiment, 2nd Battalion (Rugby)
Sapper F. J. Coombes, Royal Engineers (Lewisham)
Private G. H. Cox, Royal Army Service Corps (Bradford)
Corporal A. C. Craig, Royal Army Service Corps, 23rd Division M.T. Company (Chipping Sodbury)
Sergeant Drummer F. W. Crisp, Royal Warwickshire Regiment, 2nd Battalion (Walworth, London), 
Company Sergeant Major G. F. Critchley, Machine Gun Corps, 48th Battalion (Gloucester)
Private W. H. Croasdell, Royal Army Medical Corps, 70th Field Ambulance (Peckham)
Lance Bombardier A. A. Crouch, Royal Garrison Artillery, 247th Siege Battery (Gravesend)
Quartermaster Sergeant S. H. Danby, West Yorkshire Regiment, 11th Battalion (Manchester)
Private S. W. Daniels, Royal Army Veterinary Corps, 35th Mob. Veterinary Sec. (Cheltenham) Regiment, 
Sergeant J. F. Darling, Royal Army Service Corps, J. Corps, MT. Company (Eltham), 
Private J. O. Davies, Royal Army Service Corps, 23rd HQ (Llangollen)
Private H. C. Dawson, Royal Army Veterinary Corps, Veterinary Hospital (Bromley-by-Bow), 
Private S. Day, Royal Army Service Corps, 39th Company (Reading)
Quartermaster Sergeant O. R. Delicate, Northumberland Fusiliers, 10th Battalion (E. Newcastle upon Tyne)
Private G. G. W. Detheridge, Royal Engineers, Signal Company, Headquarters, Heavy Artillery (Hitchin)
Company Sergeant Major A. H. Dines, Royal Army Service Corps, 1034 Company (Lavender Hill)
Sergeant W. Donaldson, Royal Engineers, 6th Field Survey Company (Belfast)
Sergeant P. Douglas, Labour Corps, 210th Divisional Emp. Company (Alloa)
Corporal H. Doyle, Scots Guards, 2nd Battalion (Chelford)
Lance Corporal T. W. Driver, Royal Army Ordnance Corps, L. of C. (Leicester), 
Company Quartermaster Sergeant A. H. Dyer, Gloucestershire Regiment, 4th Battalion (Bristol)
Private J. A. Earley, Royal Berkshire Regiment, 4th Battalion (Reading)
Staff Sergeant J. A. Edwards, Royal Army Service Corps, 1st Company, 23rd D.T. (Pembroke Dock)
Sergeant Major W. G. Elcombe, Royal Army Medical Corps, 22nd Field Ambulance (Forest Gate)
Corporal W. Elsworth, Royal Engineers, 20th Infantry Brigade (Kensal Rise)
Private G. W. Elwell, Royal Army Medical Corps, 21st Field Ambulance (South Hemsall)
Staff Sergeant Major A. J. Embleton, Royal Army Service Corps, 2nd Company, 23rd D.T. (Clapham)
Sergeant T. S. Entwistle, Royal Engineers, Headquarters, 48th Division (E. Lancaster)
Staff Sergeant F. J. Evans, Royal Army Service Corps, 460th H.T. Company (Harborne)
Private J. W. Evans, Royal Army Service Corps (Liverpool)
Company Quartermaster Sergeant H. Fail, Northumberland Fusiliers, 11th Battalion (Wickham)
Mechanist Staff Sergeant A. F. Flint, Royal Army Service Corps, 48th Division M.T. Company (Chelmsford)
Company Sergeant Major F. Floyd, Royal Warwickshire Regiment, 5th Battalion (Birmingham)
Sergeant F. J. Fluck, Machine Gun Corps, 48th Battalion (Cheltenham)
Sergeant F. Fowler, Royal Warwickshire Regiment, 5th Battalion (Bownville)
Private G. H. Francis, North Staffordshire Regiment, 1st Battalion (Smethwick)
Private P. R. Francis, Royal Army Veterinary Corps, 7th Division (South Africa)
Colour Sergeant R. Franckeiss, Machine Gun Corps, 7th Battalion (Putney)
Corporal R. Freeman, Royal Army Service Corps, Headquarters, 7th Division (Daventry)
Staff Sergeant Major F. G. Gent, Northamptonshire Yeomanry (Wellingboro)
Corporal E. R. Goodchild, Royal Army Service Corps, Headquarters, 69th Infantry Brigade (Bradford)
Squadron Quartermaster Sergeant A. A. Goodey, Royal Army Service Corps, 32nd L. of C. Sup. Company (Ipswich)
Corporal W. A. Goodhew, Royal Army Service Corps, 2nd Base Motor Transport Depot (Westcliff)
Corporal E. J. Goreham, Royal Army Service Corps (Great Yarmouth)
Sergeant P. Graley, Manchester Regiment, 22nd Battalion (Manchester)
Battery Sergeant Major R. Grantham, Royal Field Artillery, 31/35th Brigade (Scunthorpe)
Sergeant T. G. Griffiths, Royal Warwickshire Regiment, 6th Battalion (Birmingham)
Sergeant J. Grindrod, Manchester Regiment, 22nd Battalion (Manchester)
Sergeant W. Haggerston, Yorkshire Regiment, 8th Battalion (South Shields)
Sergeant A. W. Hall, Labour Corps, 263rd Labour Company (London)
2nd Corporal W. J. Hall, Royal Engineers, 285th A.T. Company (Walton-at-Stone)
Corporal J. H. Hallworth, Royal Army Service Corps, 654th Company (Poynson)
Sergeant G. H. Hardiman, Gloucestershire Regiment, 5th Battalion (Gloucester)
Staff Sergeant P. Hare, Royal Engineers (Peterborough)
Company Quartermaster Sergeant H. J. Harmsworth, Oxfordshire & Buckinghamshire Light Infantry, 4th Battalion (Deddington)
Sergeant H. P. Harrison, Royal Army Medical Corps, 3rd (S Mid) Field Ambulance (Bristol)
Company Sergeant Major A. L. J. Heal, Devonshire Regiment, 8th Battalion (Fareham)
Private J. H. Henderson, Coldstream Guards, 3rd Battalion (Berwick-on-Tweed)
Sergeant S. Hill, Manchester Regiment, 24th Battalion (Oldham)
Quartermaster Sergeant T. Holliman, Royal West Surrey Regiment, 2nd Battalion (Brentwood)
Corporal W. G. Hopkins, Machine Gun Corps, 7th Battalion (Newton Longville)
Sergeant W. Hopper, Yorkshire Light Infantry, 8th Battalion (Arthington)
Corporal Engineers Clerk W. H. Hopper, Royal Engineers (Saltburn-by-the-Sea)
Sergeant E. J. Horsley, Royal Warwickshire Regiment, 6th Battalion (Sudbury)
Sergeant Major G. F. Hurran, Royal Army Medical Corps, 62nd General Hospital (South Woodford), 
Staff Sergeant Major J. Huskisson, Royal Army Service Corps, HQL. of C. (Boughton Heath), 
Private F. Isted, Royal Sussex Regiment, 5th Battalion (Ashburnham)
Sergeant J. R. Jenkinson, Royal West Surrey Regiment, 2nd Battalion (Finsbury Park)
Quartermaster Sergeant W. R. G. Johnson, Worcestershire Regiment, 7th Battalion (Kidderminster)
Corporal A. P. Jones, Royal Army Service Corps, attd. 71st Field Ambulance (Blackpool)
Driver T. M. Jones, Royal Field Artillery, 48th Divisional Artillery Column (Cwmbach)
Sergeant T. R. Jones, Worcestershire Regiment, 8th Battalion (Bromyard)
Staff Sergeant J. H. Joyce, Royal Army Ordnance Corps (Leicester)
Sergeant W. Kernohan, Royal Engineers, 95th Field Company (Belfast)
Private A. Kidby, Royal Army Veterinary Corps, attd. Headquarters, 91st Infantry Brigade (Weeley Heath), 
Private G. A. King, Royal Army Service Corps, Headquarters, 48th Division (North Finchley), 
Sergeant A. R. Laing, Royal Engineers, Signal Company (Birmingham)
Battery Quartermaster Sergeant F. K. Langdon, Royal Field Artillery, 72nd Brigade, A.C. (Baling)
Company Quartermaster Sergeant O. Lapworth, Royal Warwickshire Regiment, 7th Battalion (Nuneaton)
Driver A. Lawton, Royal Army Service Corps, 3rd Company, 48th D.T. (Birmingham)
Sergeant S. H. Leggett, Royal Engineers, 8th (Mon.) A.T. Company (Portsea)
Sergeant G. R. Leggott, Royal Field Artillery, D/102nd Brigade (Scunthorpe)
Private L. Leonard, Labour Corps, 196th Labour Company (Musselburgh)
Private W. H. Lloyd, Oxfordshire & Buckinghamshire Light Infantry, 4th Battalion (Great Bedwyn)
2nd Corporal P. F. Lodge, Royal Engineers, 23rd Signal Company (Boscombe)
Gunner F. Lord, Royal Field Artillery, 35th Brigade (Rusthall)
Private R. Lucas, Royal Army Service Corps, Headquarters, 48th Division (Handsworth), 
Private D. Maltby, Royal Army Medical Corps, 69th Field Ambulance (Nottingham)
Private H. J. Manton, Royal Engineers, Signal Company General Headquarters, (Wood Green, London), 
Lance Corporal J. Maples, Corps Of Military Police, Military Foot Police (Sparkhill)
Mechanist Staff Sergeant S. H. Markham, Royal Army Service Corps, 609th Company (Norwich)
Corporal W. Mason, Labour Corps, 210th Division Emp. Company (Todmorden)
Sergeant J. Massey, Labour Corps, 196th Labour Company (Tipton)
Farrier Quartermaster Sergeant J. May, Northamptonshire Yeomanry (Castlethorpe)
Sergeant A. McConvill, South Staffordshire Regiment, 1st Battalion (Birmingham)
Private L. McCoy, Royal Warwickshire Regiment, 6th Battalion (Birmingham)
Sergeant D. McGrath, Royal Engineers, 285th A.T. Company (Eastwood)
Sergeant J. Milligan  Border Regiment, 2nd Battalion (Workington)
Sergeant S. G. Milton, Devonshire Regiment, 9th Battalion (Exeter)
Sergeant R. Mol, Gordon Highlanders, 2nd Battalion (Glasgow)
Sergeant R. Moody, Royal Army Service Corps, 19th Squadron Rmts. (Claverton), 
Private F. A. Moss, Royal Army Service Corps, General Headquarters, (Clapham Common)
Sergeant J. Murdoch, Royal Field Artillery, 103rd Brigade (Aberdeen)
Private J. Murphy, Manchester Regiment, 21st Battalion (Manchester)
Company Sergeant Major J. Murphy, Machine Gun Corps, 23rd Battalion (Cork)
Staff Sergeant Major W. G. Needham, Royal Army Service Corps, 2nd Auxiliary Pk. T. (Basingstoke), 
Sergeant S. W. Newton, Oxfordshire & Buckinghamshire Light Infantry, 1st Buckinghamshire Battalion (Stone)
Private F. Nickson, Manchester Regiment, 20th Battalion (Manley)
Sergeant G. Nightingale, Royal Warwickshire Regiment, 5th Battalion (Birmingham)
Private H. Nuttall, Manchester Regiment, 24th Battalion (Manchester)
Battery Sergeant Major F. J. Packer, Royal Garrison Artillery, 176th Siege Battery (Laira)
Temp Staff Sergeant Major G. Packer, Royal Army Service Corps, 86th Company (Deptford)
Private R. H. Painter, Manchester Regiment, 21st Battalion (Manchester)
Corporal F. R. Parker, Worcestershire Regiment, 8th Battalion (Buckingham)
Sergeant R. J. Parker, Royal Engineers, Signal Company (Finsbury, London), 
Temp Sergeant Major H. S. Parlett, Royal Garrison Artillery, 7th Divisional Artillery (Crouch End)
Sergeant A. R. Parnell, Royal Warwickshire Regiment, 7th Battalion (Nuneaton)
Sergeant E. J. Peverett, Royal Engineers, Postal Section (Hendon)
Mechanist Staff Sergeant A. G. Pillar, Royal Army Service Corps, 654th Company (Cotmd)
Company Quartermaster Sergeant C. R. Pitman, Royal Berkshire Regiment, 4th Battalion (Reading)
Company Sergeant Major J. Pollock, Machine Gun Corps, 48th Battalion (Cavan)
Private E. J. Pratt, Royal Army Medical Corps, attd. D.D.M.S. (Weston-super-Mare)
Temp Sergeant Major G. W. Pullen, York & Lancaster Regiment, 9th Battalion (Maidstone)
Sergeant R. Rigby, Border Regiment, 2nd Battalion (Manchester)
Ft Staff Sergeant W. M. Robb, Royal Garrison Artillery, 317th Siege Battery (Lonmay)
Sergeant L. Roberts, Royal Field Artillery, 105/22nd Brigade (Mitcham)
Private A. Robinson, Machine Gun Corps, 23rd Battalion (Birmingham)
Sergeant T. Rourke, Royal Army Veterinary Corps, 22nd Veterinary Hospital (Goldenhill), 
Sergeant A. G. R. Russell, Oxfordshire & Buckinghamshire Light Infantry, 4th Battalion (Chichester)
Quartermaster Sergeant G. Rutter, Royal Army Medical Corps, 2nd (S. Mid) Field Ambulance (Walsall)
Corporal C. Salter, South Staffordshire Regiment, 9th Battalion (Wolverhampton)
Corporal R. Sansome, Oxfordshire & Buckinghamshire Light Infantry, 4th Battalion (Launton, Bicester)
Gunner M. Scott, Royal Field Artillery, 7th Divisional Artillery Column (Morpeth)
Corporal H. Scrouston, Machine Gun Corps, 23rd Battalion (Leven)
Company Sergeant Major R. Sinclair, Royal Engineers, Signal Company (E. Dublin)
Sergeant J. Slater, Royal Engineers, 528th Durham Field Company (Whiteinch)
Quartermaster Sergeant C. G. Sleath, Royal Warwickshire Regiment, 8th Battalion (Wolverhampton)
Sergeant T. Slim, Machine Gun Corps, 144th Company (Netherton)
Squadron Quartermaster Sergeant J. T. H. Smith, Royal Army Service Corps, 4th Company, 48th D.T. (Reading)
Company Quartermaster Sergeant F. A. Snarey, Royal Berkshire Regiment, 4th Battalion (Beading)
Company Sergeant Major T. Spedding, Durham Light Infantry, 12th Battalion (Pelton Fell)
Squadron Quartermaster Sergeant J. Spencer, Northamptonshire Yeomanry (Peterborough)
Corporal J. L. Spokes, Royal Field Artillery, 3rd (South Midland) Brigade (Birmingham)
Staff Sergeant R. Stacey, Royal Army Service Corps, Headquarters, 7th Division (Goodmayes), 
Private A. Starr, Royal Army Service Corps, Headquarters, 14th Corps (Hollington), 
Quartermaster Sergeant J. Stevens, South Staffordshire Regiment, 9th Battalion (Newtown, N. Wales), 
Sergeant W. G. Stevens, Royal Engineers, 48th D.S. Company (Bristol)
Sergeant E. G. Stone, Royal Warwickshire Regiment, 8th Battalion (Birmingham)
Sergeant J. Strachan, Gordon Highlanders, 2nd Battalion (Denny)
Private L. S. Stratford, Oxfordshire & Buckinghamshire Light Infantry, 4th Battalion (Chipping Norton)
Bombardier H. R. Taylor, Royal Garrison Artillery, Clks. Sec. (St. Thomas, Exeter)
Corporal J. T. N. Taylor, Royal Army Service Corps, 654th Company (Manchester)
Private W. Taylor, Devonshire Regiment, 8th Battalion (Bedminster)
Corporal W. Telfer, Durham Light Infantry, 12th Battalion (Chester-le-Street)
Company Sergeant Major J. R. Thome, Royal Engineers, 474th (S. Mid.) Field Company (Bedminster)
Company Sergeant Major T. Tinlin, Royal Army Service Corps, 7th Division M.T. Company (Heaton)
Sergeant C. Turner, Royal Field Artillery, 48th Trench Mortar Battery (Arlesey)
Corporal S. Twine, West Riding Regiment, 10th Battalion (Keighley)
Private M. R. Vaughan, Lancers, 16th (Lewisham)
Quartermaster Sergeant H. Waine, Machine Gun Corps, 48th Battalion (Bicester)
Battery Quartermaster Sergeant G. F. Walker, Royal Field Artillery, 23rd Divisional Artillery Column (Seaford)
Corporal H. Walker, Royal Welsh Fusiliers, 1st Battalion (Smethwick)
Private G. Wallington, Royal Army Service Corps (Eckmansworth)
Corporal M. A. Walsh, Honourable Artillery Company, 2nd Battalion (Tuam)
Corporal R. Westwood, Northumberland Fusiliers, 11th Battalion (Royston)
Company Sergeant Major A. H. White, Royal Sussex Regiment, 5th Battalion (Hastings)
Company Sergeant Major H. J. White, Royal Engineers, 48th Divisional Signals Company (Horfield)
Company Quartermaster Sergeant F. C. Williams, Gloucestershire Regiment, 6th Battalion (Bristol)
Sergeant F. M. Williams, Devonshire Regiment, 8th Battalion (Penzance)
Sergeant J. G. Wilson, Royal West Surrey Regiment, 2nd Battalion (Harrow)
Sergeant J. L. Wilson, Royal Army Service Corps, 14th Corps Troops Company (Paisley)
Driver J. H. Winter, Royal Field Artillery, 2nd South Midland Brigade (Kidderminster)
Sergeant R. Witcombe, Gloucestershire Regiment, 6th Battalion (Bristol)
Sergeant G. A. Woodland, Coldstream Guards, 3rd Battalion (Bath)
Private H. L. Wright, Royal Welsh Fusiliers, 1st Battalion (Openshaw)
Corporal R. Yapp, Worcestershire Regiment, 7th Battalion (Tenbury)
Sergeant G. D. Adam, 4th Battalion, attd. 2nd Battalion, Argyll and Sutherland Highlanders (Glasgow)
Corporal C. Adams, 230th Siege Battery, Royal Garrison Artillery (Crimpleston, Norfolk)
Company Sergeant Major R. Adams, 9th Battalion, Royal Inniskilling Fusiliers (Barnscourt, County Tyrone)
Fitter W. K. Aldborough, 121st Heavy Battery, Royal Garrison Artillery (Norwich)
Private B. Aldridge, 2nd Battalion, York & Lancaster Regiment (Sheffield)
Sergeant G. Alexander, 41st Battery, Royal Field Artillery (Abertillery)
Company Sergeant Major C. E. Allen, 10th Battalion, East Yorkshire Regiment (Bridlington)
Corporal H. J. Allen, 5th Battalion, Northumberland Fusiliers (Fletcham, King's Lynn)
Corporal W. L. Anderson, 37th Divisional Signals Company, Royal Engineers (Gateshead)
Lance Corporal A. Andrews, 12th Battalion, Norfolk Regiment, T.F (Norwich)
Sergeant F. Archer  1st Battalion, Duke of Cornwall's Light Infantry (Ponders End)
Sergeant L. W. Ardley, No. 1 Spec. Company, Royal Engineers (Barking)
Company Sergeant Major G. E. Argyle, 155th Field Company, Royal Engineers (Pembroke Dock)
Sergeant S. Armstrong, 1/7th Battalion, Cheshire Regiment (Macclesfield)
Sapper T. Arthur, 151st Field Company, Royal Engineers (Tyslorstown, Glamorgan)
Sergeant C. T. Atkinson, 116th Battery, 26th Army Brigade, Royal Field Artillery (London)
Sergeant H. Atkinson, VII. Corps Cyclist Battalion, Army Cyclist Corps (Lancaster)
Sapper J. Atkinson, 2nd Field Sur. Battalion, Royal Engineers (Gillingham, Kent)
Sergeant J. Atterbury, 1/6th Battalion, Nottinghamshire and Derbyshire Regiment (Ashbourne)
Company Quartermaster Sergeant W. Austin, 1st Battalion, Bedfordshire Regiment (Redbourne)
Corporal S. P. Baggott, 280th Siege Battery, 16th Brigade, Royal Garrison Artillery (Pleck, Walsall)
Sergeant J. W. Bailey, attd. T. A.A. Battery, Royal Garrison Artillery (Stoke-on-Trent)
Corporal T. L. Bailey, B/177th Brigade, Royal Field Artillery (Burslem)
Company Sergeant Major H. Baker, 25th Battalion, Royal Welsh Fusiliers (Rhondda Valley)
2nd Corporal M. Baker, 152nd Field Company, Royal Engineers (Manchester)
Sergeant L. J. Baldwin, D/330th (East Lancaster) Brigade, Royal Field Artillery (Rowhedge)
Lance Corporal H. J. Bamford, 6th Battalion, Somerset Light Infantry (Bristol)
Sergeant F. Bareham, 113th Siege Battery, Royal Garrison Artillery (E. Clacton, Essex)
Company Sergeant Major R. Barker, 2/6th Battalion, Liverpool Regiment (Wakefield)
Colour Sergeant A. Barr, 9th Battalion, Scottish Rifles (Creetown)
Sergeant M. Barr  C/106th Brigade, Royal Field Artillery (Balloch)
Signaller (Bombardier) H. C. Barrett, attd. 95th Brigade, Royal Field Artillery (Tooting)
Pioneer J. Barren, 35th Divisional Signals Company, Royal Engineers (Kinnillar, Aderdeen)
Private E. Barsdell, 8th Battalion (now Depot), East Surrey Regiment (Bayswater)
Corporal T. E. G. Bashford, Royal Army Service Corps, attd. 65th Siege Battery, Ammunition Column, Royal Garrison Artillery (Boro Green, Kent)
Sergeant H. Bastow  Signal Sub-Sect, Royal Engineers, attd. 81st Brigade, Royal Garrison Artillery (Bradford)
Battery Sergeant Major E. Bathe, 28th Siege Battery, Royal Garrison Artillery (nr. Petworth, Sussex)
Sergeant W. Bayfield, 11th Battalion, Durham Light Infantry (South Shields)
Sergeant H. C. Beale, 18th Battalion, Middlesex Regiment, attd. 36th Trench Mortar Battery (Wood Green, London)
Corporal E. A. Beales, Royal Garrison Artillery, attd. C. A.A. Battery. (Button)
Sergeant J. H. Beard, 7th Battalion, Leicestershire Regiment (Coulville)
Sergeant J. Beattie, 20th Siege Battery, Royal Garrison Artillery (Hartlepool)
Lance Corporal J. C. Beauchamp, 341st Road Con. Company, Royal Engineers (Birmingham)
Sergeant F. Beaver, 16th Battalion, Royal Warwickshire Regiment (Birmingham)
Sergeant W. H. Beavington, 2/2nd Battalion London Regiment (Kingsway, London)
Sergeant F. Beck  9th Battalion, Norfolk Regiment (Walsingham)
Private J. F. Beck, 17th Battalion, Royal Welsh Fusiliers (Cockermouth)
Sergeant A. Beddows, B/285th (West Lancaster) Brigade, Royal Field Artillery (Tettenhall Wood)
Sergeant Drummer W. Bell, 3rd Battalion, London Regiment (Oicklewood)
Sergeant T. Belliss  520th (London) Field Company, Royal Engineers (Fulham, London)
Lance Sergeant G. Bellyou, 15th Battalion, Cheshire Regiment (Bethnal Green, London)
Bombardier S. Bent, 331st Siege Battery, Royal Garrison Artillery (Nottingham)
Sergeant H. Bentley  210th (East Lancaster) Brigade, Royal Field Artillery (Accrington)
Sergeant L. Beverley, 140th Siege Battery, Royal Garrison Artillery (Worthing)
Sergeant C. Billson, 7th Battalion, Leicestershire Regiment (Leicester)
Corporal W. Blackhurst, Royal Field Artillery, attd. X/24th Trench Mortar Battery (Hayes, Staffs.)
Lance Corporal E. Blacktin, Labour Corps (Sparkbrook)
Sergeant S. Blake, Royal Artillery A. Battery, Royal Garrison Artillery (Branksome, Dorset)
Temp Staff Sergeant Major G. J. Bleach, 4th Cavalry Division Auxiliary M.T. Company, Royal Army Service Corps (Blackland, Kent)
Corporal J. F. Bliss, 9th Battalion, North Staffordshire Regiment (Edgbaston)
Sapper W. H. Bloxham, 35th Divisional Signals Company, Royal Engineers (Maidstone)
Company Sergeant Major F. Blunt, 61st Battalion, Machine Gun Corps (Bradford)
Acting Company Sergeant Major G. E. Blunt, 1st Battalion, Border Regiment (London)
Pioneer J. Blyth, 196th L.D. Company, Royal Engineers (Alford, Lincolnshire)
Lance Corporal W. J. Boal, 9th Battalion, Royal Inniskilling Fusiliers (Belfast)
Battery Quartermaster Sergeant J. W. Boddie, 1st Battalion, Dorsetshire Regiment (Southsea)
Bombardier A. Bode, 49th Battery, Royal Field Artillery (Liverpool)
Sergeant W. S. Bodimead, C/230th (North Midland) Brigade, Royal Field Artillery (East Finchley)
Private H. Bodsworth, 2nd Battalion, Lincolnshire Regiment (Sheffield)
Sergeant W. C. Bolter, 4th Battalion, Royal Fusiliers (Custom House, London)
Battery Sergeant Major A. W. Bond, 232nd Siege Battery, Royal Garrison Artillery (Melton Constable)
Temp Regimental Sergeant Major E. E. Bond, 1st King Edward's Horse (Liverpool)
Battery Quartermaster Sergeant J. Bond, 2nd Battalion, Leinster Regiment (Clonmellon)
Sergeant J. Booth, 175th Tunnelling Company, Royal Engineers (Milton)
Company Sergeant Major J. S. Boothroyd, 29th Battalion, Durham Light Infantry (Lockwood)
Company Sergeant Major G. W. Boreham, 1st Battalion, Grenadier Guards (Shotley, Ipswich)
Sergeant W. H. Bossom, L. Spec. Company, Royal Engineers (Cannock)
Sergeant F. Bound, 276th Siege Battery, Royal Garrison Artillery (Wooleton)
Company Quartermaster Sergeant P. G. Bowden, 2nd Battalion, Machine Gun Corps (Bristol)
Company Sergeant Major W. J. Bowen, 1/2nd Battalion, Monmouthshire Regiment (Abercarn) J91790
Lance Bombardier H. Box, L. A.A. Battery, Royal Garrison Artillery (Bristol)
Acting Company Sergeant Major R. Boyd, 1/4th Battalion, Royal Scots Fusiliers (Stevenson)
Gunner R. Bradley, 50th Battery, 34 Army Brigade, Royal Field Artillery (Blackburn)
Sergeant C. E. Braithwaite, 49th Siege Battery, Royal Garrison Artillery (Glamorgan)
Company Sergeant Major E. Branch, 25th Battalion, Royal Welsh Fusiliers (Taffe Well)
Battery Sergeant Major R. Branch, 18th Army Brigade Ammunition Column, Royal Field Artillery (Woodham Ferris)
Company Sergeant Major J. C. Brash, 412th Field Company, Royal Engineers (Glenboig)
Sergeant L. Brazier, 2/4th Battalion, Royal West Surrey Regiment (Lindfield, Sussex)
Sergeant H. Breckenridge, 1/5th Battalion, Argyll and Sutherland Highlanders (Greenock)
Sergeant W. Brewis  1/1st Northumberland Hussars (Birkley)
Sergeant J. Bridger, Railway Operating Division, Royal Engineers (Dulwich)
Private H. Bridgman, 1st (North Midland) Field Ambulance, Royal Army Medical Corps (Derby)
Battery Sergeant Major H. A. Bridle, 291st Siege Battery, Royal Garrison Artillery (Coventry)
Temp Regimental Sergeant Major J. E. Bright, 1/4th Battalion, Cheshire Regiment (Hapton, near Burnley)
Sergeant R. Brine, let Battalion, Hampshire Regiment (Acton Vale, London)
Sergeant E. L. Briesenden, 179th (now 289th) Siege Battery, Royal Garrison Artillery (Ashford)
2nd Corporal E. Broadhead, 37th Divisional Signals Company, Royal Engineers (Manchester)
Staff Sergeant W. Brookes  63rd (West Lancaster) Field Ambulance, Royal Army Medical Corps (Liverpool)
Sergeant W. C. Brookland, 1/20th Battalion, London Regiment (Eltham)
Company Sergeant Major J. Brooks, 11th Battalion, Rifle Brigade (Brightlingsea)
Lance Corporal T. Browning, 124th Field Company, Royal Engineers (Beeston)
Sapper G. Buckeridge, 37th Divisional Signals Company, Royal Engineers (Nunhead, London)
Company Quartermaster Sergeant W. H. Budgen, 7th Battalion, Royal Sussex Regiment (East Grinstead)
Acting Corporal G. Bullimore, 8th Battalion, Seaforth Highlanders, attd. 44th Trench Mortar Battery (North Waisham)
Private F. Bunce, Royal Army Service Corps, attd. O.A.A. Battery, Royal Garrison Artillery (Fordingbridge)
Sergeant J. H. J. Burgess, 9th Battalion, Nottinghamshire and Derbyshire Regiment (Newark)
Staff Sergeant F. G. Burling, 2/1st (South Midland) Field Ambulance, Royal Army Medical Corps (Birmingham)
Gunner J. Burns, 256th (Highland) Brigade, Royal Field Artillery (Methil, Fife)
Sergeant R. W. M. Burns, 2/5th Battalion, Royal Lancaster Regiment (Lancaster)
Corporal A. E. Burr, 103rd Field Company, Royal Engineers (Camberwell, London)
Sergeant H. J. Burr, D/52nd Army Brigade, Royal Field Artillery (Fleet, Hampshire.)
Sergeant F. L. Butler, N/5th Army Brigade, Royal Horse Artillery (Bermondsey)
Private H. Butler, 2/4th Battalion, Royal Berkshire Regiment (Maidenhead)
Sergeant M. A. Butler  1st Field Ambulance, Royal Army Medical Corps (Reading)
Private J. A. Byrne, 14th Battalion, Royal Welsh Fusiliers (Clacton-on-Sea)
Farrier Staff Sergeant J. Cahill, 11th Hussars (Kilcullen)
Regimental Sergeant Major T. Cahill, 1st Battalion, Irish Guards (Bandon, County Cork)
Private W. G. Calder, 1/14th Battalion, London Regiment, attd. 168th Trench Mortar Battery (Shawlands)
Company Sergeant Major A. Caldwell, 16th Battalion, Highland Light Infantry (Glasgow)
Staff Sergeant Major A. Callaghan, 8th Squadron, Cavalry Machine Gun Corps (Baling)
Sergeant J. B. Callaghan, 8th Battalion, Tank Corps (Glossop)
Sergeant N. Cameron, 9th Battalion, Gordon Highlanders (Perth)
Sapper A. Campbell, 52nd (Lowland) Divisional Signals Company, Royal Engineers (Glasgow)
Fitter Staff Sergeant J. Capey, 139th Heavy Battery, Royal Garrison Artillery (Hanley)
Company Quartermaster Sergeant T. Carr, 8th Battalion, Liverpool Regiment (Liverpool)
Corporal G. H. Carter, Royal Engineers, attd. 113th Army Brigade, Royal Field Artillery (Charles Hill, London)
Sergeant E. J. Case, 1/17th Battalion, London Regiment (Limehouse)
Sergeant D. Cattanach, 425th Battery, 44th Brigade, Royal Field Artillery (Friockheim)
Private C. P. Cavanagh, 10th Hussars (Manchester)
Corporal J. W. Chadwick, V/1 H Trench Mortar Battery, Royal Garrison Artillery (Shaw, near Oldham)
Battery Quartermaster Sergeant R. P. Chapman, 6th Dragoons (Wakefield)
Private P. D. Charles, 1/5th Battalion, London Regiment (Newport, Mon.)
Temp Regimental Sergeant Major H. Chesney, 1/20th Battalion, London Regiment (Charlton)
Battery Sergeant Major E. B. Child, attd. 16th Army Brigade, Royal Horse Artillery (Great Yarmouth)
Private H. S. Child, 15/17th Battalion, West Yorkshire Regiment (York)
Sapper H. M. Christopher, 38th Divisional Signals Company, Royal Engineers (Liverpool)
Staff Sergeant Major E. J. Churchill, 20th Hussars (Norwich)
Sergeant R. C. Clammer, 1/4th Battalion, London Regiment (Pitfield Street, London)
Acting Sergeant C. Clarke, Border Regiment, attd. 1st Battalion, Wiltshire Regiment (Carlisle)
Sergeant A. E. Clements, 5th Battalion, Tank Corps (Walworth, London)
Private F. H. G. Clements, 1st Battalion, Tank Corps (Paignton)
Private O. Cliff, 2nd Battalion, Yorkshire Light Infantry (Sheffield)
Sergeant F. T. Clifford, 94th Field Company, Royal Engineers (Stow-on-the-Wold)
Sergeant P. Cobley, 1st Battalion, Wiltshire Regiment (Wimbledon)
Private W. R. Colclough, 4th Battalion, Yorkshire Regiment, attd. 150th Trench Mortar Battery (Thornaby)
Sergeant W. J. P. Cole, Royal Army Service Corps, attd. 260th Siege Battery, Ammunition Column, Royal Garrison Artillery (Southampton)
Sergeant G. R. Ceilings, 24th Divisional Signals Company, Royal Engineers (Swindon)
Sergeant J. Colman  55th Battalion, Machine Gun Corps (Wroxham)
Company Sergeant Major J. Conn, 9th Battalion, Royal Inniskilling Fusiliers (Caledon, County Tyrone)
2nd Corporal J. Connor, 55th (West Lancaster) Divisional Signals Company, Royal Engineers (St. Helens)
Private E. Conroy, 1/5th Battalion, Lincolnshire Regiment (Cleethorpea)
Sergeant H. C. Cook, attd. 173rd Brigade, Royal Field Artillery (Tring)
Smith/Quartermaster Sergeant J. Cook, 87th Siege Battery, Royal Garrison Artillery (Portsmouth)
Lance Corporal J. Cooper, 1/5th Battalion, Nottinghamshire and Derbyshire Regiment (New Mills, Derby)
Acting Sergeant A. V. Coppard, 2nd Battalion, Royal Sussex Regiment (Hurst Green, Sussex)
Sergeant P. G. Cork, attd. 74th Brigade, Royal Field Artillery (Dover)
Sergeant H. Comes, 1st Battalion, Shropshire Light Infantry, attd. 16th Trench Mortar Battery (Stoke-on-Trent)
Petty Officer T. Cotcher, Drake Battalion, Royal Naval Volunteer Reserve (Wallsend-on-Tyne)
Sergeant E. Cottam, 351st Siege Battery, Royal Garrison Artillery (Plymouth)
Sergeant L. Couch, 21st Heavy Battery, Royal Garrison Artillery (Ilfracombe)
Corporal A. Coviello, 28th Battalion, posted 16th Battalion, London Regiment (Brondesbury)
Private T. Cowan, 14th Battalion, Highland Light Infantry (Glasgow)
Sergeant G. Craddock, B/47th Brigade, Royal Field Artillery (Ely.)
Sergeant J. Crankshaw, 114th A.A. Section, Royal Garrison Artillery (Morton)
Regimental Sergeant Major J. Cresswell, 2nd Battalion, Durham Light Infantry (Bishop Auckland)
Private W. C. Crosby, 37th Division Supp. Column Royal Army Service Corps (Chelsea)
Gunner G. Crossland, D/83rd Brigade, Royal Field Artillery (Crofton)
Sergeant E. Crowston  108th Siege Battery, Royal Garrison Artillery (Radford)
Private H. Croxall, 8th Battalion, Machine Gun Corps (Annesley)
Sergeant R. J. Cullen, B/152nd Brigade, Royal Field Artillery (Margate)
Sergeant T. Cullen, 1st Battalion, Royal Dublin Fusiliers (Dublin)
Sergeant A. R. Cunningham, Y Battery, 7th Brigade, Royal Horse Artillery (Pres-de-Samer, France)
Lance Corporal A. J. Curd, 13th Battalion, Royal Sussex Regiment (Lancing, Sussex)
Company Sergeant Major J. Cussens, Royal Inniskilling Fusiliers (Farnborough, Hampshire)
Mtr.Cyclist Sergeant H. A. Cutler, 1st Divisional Signals Company, Royal Engineers (King's Norton)
Sergeant A. Cutting, D/88th Brigade, Royal Field Artillery (Bath)
Colour Sergeant C. Dadd, 12th How. Battery, R. Mar. Artillery (Bexley Heath)
Corporal A. Davies, 6th Battalion, Shropshire Light Infantry (Ross)
Sergeant E. P. Davies, 25th Battalion, Royal Welsh Fusiliers (Newcastle Emlyn)
Staff Sergeant G. T. Davies, 130th Field Ambulance, Royal Army Medical Corps (Pontardawe)
Sergeant G. T. Davies, 1/5th Battalion, South Staffordshire Regiment (Hockley)
Fitter J. H. Davis, 5th Battery, 45th Brigade, Royal Field Artillery (Bristol)
Sergeant F. Davison, 1st Battalion, Northamptonshire Regiment (Kettering)
Sergeant B. E. Davy, 479th (South Midland) Field Company, Royal Engineers (Cheltenham)
Sergeant H. Dawson, 62nd (West Riding) Divisional Signals Company, Royal Engineers (Sheffield)
Sergeant F. W. Day, 2nd Battalion, Worcestershire Regiment (Forest Hill, London)
Sergeant H. Dean, 174th Tunnelling Company, Royal Engineers (Oxford)
Sergeant P. Dearden, attd. 181st Brigade, Royal Field Artillery (Ashton-under-Lyne)
Sergeant A. Dearnley, 122nd Siege Battery, Royal Garrison Artillery (Huddersfield)
Sergeant H. Denson, Royal Army Service Corps, attd. 59th Siege Battery, Royal Garrison Artillery (Liverpool)
Gunner P. Denton, Royal Field Artillery, attd. Headquarters, 34th Army Brigade (E. Cowes)
Company Sergeant Major T. Derose, 36th Battalion, Machine Gun Corps (Devonport)
Corporal E. Dewar, 235th Siege Battery, Royal Garrison Artillery (Bootle)
Squadron Quartermaster Sergeant J. E. Dickinson, 1/1st (Northumberland) Hrs. (Ashington)
Sergeant P. Dight  130th Battery, Royal Field Artillery (Stellington)
Sergeant J. Dillon, 24th Battalion, Machine Gun Corps (Glasgow)
Private H. Dixon, 4th Battalion, Lincolnshire Regiment (Grimsby)
Sergeant A. E. Dodd, 226th Field Company, Royal Engineers (Shoreditch)
Battery Quartermaster Sergeant T. Donovan, 1st Battalion, Royal Munster Fusiliers (Cork)
Corporal W. S. Double, Royal Engineers, attd. Headquarters, 47th Brigade, Royal Garrison Artillery (Bow, London)
Company Sergeant Major G. T. Downes, 10th Battalion, Duke of Cornwall's Light Infantry (Putney, London)
Sergeant N. Downes, 1/4th Battalion, West Riding Regiment (Cleckheaton)
Sergeant D. Downie, 29th Battalion, Machine Gun Corps (Dunoon)
Sergeant J. Drake, 223rd Field Companyr Royal Engineers (Great Milton, near Wallingford)
Sergeant W. Drake, 150th Siege Battery, Royal Garrison Artillery (Readingley)
Sergeant E. Drew (Northumberland) Brigade, Royal Field Artillery, attd. 63rd Divisional Ammunition Column (Walkington, Yorkshire)
Sergeant D. Drylie, 1st Battalion, Scots Guards, attd. Guards Brigade Trench Mortar Battery Dunfermline
Corporal H. Duckham (South Midland) Brigade, Royal Field Artillery, attd. X/61st Trench Mortar Battery (Bristol)
Sergeant E. W. Dudley, 175th Company, Labour Corps (Kidderminster)
Sergeant J. A. Duncan, XVII Corps Cyclist Battalion, Army Cyclist Corps (Wick)
Battery Quartermaster Sergeant J. Dunn, D/250th (Northumberland) Brigade, Royal Field Artillery (Newcastle upon Tyne)
Sergeant S. C. Dunnachie, D/290th (London) Brigade, Royal Field Artillery (Oswaldtwistle)
Shoe/Smith/Corporal G. E. Dumville, B/251st (Northumberland) Brigade, Royal Field Artillery (Pocklington, Yorkshire)
Battery Sergeant Major O. W. Button, B/180th Brigade, Royal Field Artillery (Didsbury)
Sergeant S. H. Eades, 2/4th Battalion, Royal West Surrey Regiment T.F. (Croydon)
Battery Sergeant Major S. Eardley, 1/1st (North Midland) Heavy Battery, Royal Garrison Artillery (Newcastle)
Regimental Sergeant Major C. H. Edisbury, 15th Battalion, North Lancashire Regiment (Liverpool)
Battery Sergeant Major C. W. Edmonds, Royal Horse Artillery, attd. 242nd (South Midland) Army Brigade, Royal Field Artillery (London)
Sergeant A. G. Edwards, Wireless Sec|F. Corps, Signal Company, Royal Engineers (Exeter)
Sergeant B. C. L. Edwards, 2/15th Battalion, London Regiment (Balham)
Company Sergeant Major J. P. Edwards, 56th Company, Labour Corps (Rhyl)
Sergeant W. J. Edwards, 9th Battalion, Royal Welsh Fusiliers (Loughor)
Battery Sergeant Major F. T. Elbourn, 9th Siege Battery, Royal Garrison Artillery (E. Cambridge)
Sergeant G. Elliott, 12th Battalion, Nottinghamshire and Derbyshire Regiment (Chesterfield)
Sergeant H. Ellis, D/110th Brigade, Royal Field Artillery (Hammersmith)
Smith Sergeant H. J. Eknes, 21st Siege Battery, Royal Garrison Artillery (Swindon)
Sergeant P. J. Emberson, 9th Battalion, Norfolk Regiment (Brentwood)
Sergeant A. Emslie, 4d4th (Highland) Field Company, Royal Engineers (Aberdeen)
Sergeant A. Eustace, 16th Battery, 41st Brigade, Royal Field Artillery (Romiley)
Sergeant G. Evans  B/148th Brigade, Royal Field Artillery (Liverpool)
Private H. J. Evans, 11th Battalion, Somerset Light Infantry (Swindon)
Company Sergeant Major S. Evans, 1st Battalion, Shropshire Light Infantry (Wellington, Salop)
Battery Sergeant Major A. C. Eves, 1/1st Kent Heavy Battery, Royal Garrison Artillery (E. Bexley Heath)
Driver W. Fairbairn, attd. 50th Brigade, Royal Field Artillery (Cramlington)
Company Sergeant Major W. Fairhurst, 422nd (West Lancaster) Field Company, Royal Engineers (Hadlow, Kent)
Company Sergeant Major T. Farey, 11th Battalion, East Yorkshire Regiment (Hull)
Staff Sergeant Major R. Farrant, 7th Dragoon Guards (Folkestone)
Sergeant B. Farrow, 1st Battalion, Hertfordshire Regiment (Luton)
Sergeant G. N. Fennell, 9th Battalion, Machine Gun Corps (Hamsgate)
Company Sergeant Major A. Fiddaman, 39th Battalion, Machine Gun Corps (Ashington)
Sergeant H. Fielding, 7th Battalion, Leicestershire Regiment (Rotherham)
Corporal W. Fisher, 2nd Field Sur. Battalion, Royal Engineers (Old Trafford)
Bombardier W. Fisher, 265th Siege Battery, Royal Garrison Artillery (Claverham, near Bristol)
Battery Sergeant Major W. M. Flaherty, 287th Siege Battery, Royal Garrison Artillery (Guernsey)
Corporal C. G. Flockhart, 10th Battalion, Argyll and Sutherland Highlanders (Kelty, Fife)
Company Sergeant Major J. Ford, 1st Battalion, Cameron Highlanders (Carnoustie)
Company Sergeant Major W. Forkin, 2/5th Battalion, North Lancashire Regiment T.F. (Bolton)
Sapper F. Forrest, 5th Field Sur. Battalion, Royal Engineers (Aberdeen)
Lance Corporal E. Fosten, 18th Hussars (Hull)
Sergeant W. E. Fountain, 1st Battalion, Machine Gun Corps (Kensington)
Private W. Fowler, 16th Battalion, Lancashire Fusiliers (Salford)
Private W. Fowler, 6th (London) Field Ambulance, Royal Army Medical Corps, attd. 1/21st Field Ambulance (Hanwell)
Company Sergeant Major J. H. S. Francis, 2nd Battalion, Kings Royal Rifle Corps (Wivenhoe)
Rifleman W. H. Francis, 1/17th Battalion, London Regiment (Euston Square)
Temp Regimental Sergeant Major S. H. Franey, 23rd Battalion, Royal Fusiliers (Burton-on-Trent)
Sergeant J. McN. Fraser, 51st Battalion, Machine Gun Corps (Lochane)
Sergeant W. Fraser, 18th Battalion, Machine Gun Corps (Greenock)
Sergeant A. E. V. Free, 17th Battalion, Machine Gun Corps (Chelmsford)
Sergeant A. French, 1/4th Battalion, Leicestershire Regiment (Leicester)
Corporal J. Frost, 10th Battalion, Liverpool Regiment (Liverpool)
Company Sergeant Major J. Froud, 2nd Battalion, Royal Scots Fusiliers (Vauxhall, London)
Sergeant W. C. Fruen, 55th Battalion, Machine Gun Corps (E. Mill Hill)
Battery Sergeant Major F. J. Fursdon  274th Siege Battery, Royal Garrison Artillery (Bishops Fawton, Barnstaple)
Sapper W. H. Gaffney, 30th Divisional Signals Company, Royal Engineers (E. Chatham)
Lance Corporal J. Gallimore, 1st Battalion, North Staffordshire Regiment, attd. 72nd Light Trench Mortar Battery (Stoke-on-Trent)
Smith Gunner A. Galloway, 69th Siege Battery, Royal Garrison Artillery (South Shields)
Sergeant W. D. Gamble  19th Divisional Signals Company, Royal Engineers (Salisbury)
Sergeant J. B. Gardiner  503rd (Wessex) Field Company, Royal Engineers (Bath)
Gunner F. Gardner, 299th Siege Battery, Royal Garrison Artillery, attd. 16th Ordnance Mob. Workshop (Horsham)
Sergeant S. Garnett, 15th Battalion, Durham Light Infantry (Daresbury, Cheshire)
Sergeant A. J. Garrett, 219th Siege Battery, Royal Garrison Artillery (Hull)
Corporal F. W. Garrod, 1st Battalion, Royal West Kent Regiment (Streatham, London)
Sergeant J. Gebbie, 249th Siege Battery, Royal Garrison Artillery (Edinburgh)
Lance Sergeant J. T. Gibbons, 7th Battalion, East Yorkshire Regiment, attd. 50th Infantry Brigade (Glasgow)
Corporal J. Gibson, Royal Army Service Corps, attd. 329th Siege Battery, Royal Garrison Artillery (Tayport)
Battery Sergeant Major F. Gilbert, C/331st (East Lancaster) Brigade, Royal Field Artillery (Trudhoe)
Rifleman W. C. Gillman  2nd Battalion, Royal Irish Rifles (Fulham)
Sergeant F. Gillson, 2nd Battalion, Suffolk Regiment (Rye, Northants)
Sergeant D. Glendinning, 15th Battalion, H.L.T. (Glasgow)
Battery Quartermaster Sergeant T. Glenn, 31st Heavy Battery, Royal Garrison Artillery (Colchester)
Sapper A. Godwin, 17th Divisional Signals Company, Royal Engineers (Regents Park, London)
Company Sergeant Major W. Godwin  57th Battalion, Machine Gun Corps (Swindon)
Lance Corporal W. T. Goldsworthy, 22nd Company, Labour Corps (Wingate)
Sergeant W. Goodchild, 1st Battalion, Rifle Brigade (Winchester)
Sergeant A. Goodey, 2/23rd Battalion, London Regiment (Battersea)
Battery Sergeant Major H. H. W. Goodings, B/79th Brigade, Royal Field Artillery (Leytonstone)
Lance Corporal A. E. Gordon, 15th Battalion, Royal Warwickshire Regiment (Birmingham)
Corporal A. Gough, 175th Company, Labour Corps (Nottingham)
Sergeant A. F. Gough, 2nd Battalion, Coldstream Guards (Exeter)
Sergeant F. Gould, 11th Battalion, Tank Corps (Sheffield)
Corporal J. B. Gourlay, 298th (North Midland) Army Brigade, Royal Field Artillery (St. Andrews, Scotland)
Company Sergeant Major T. C. Graham, 1/5th Battalion, King's Own Scottish Borderers (Maxwelltown)
Sergeant W. G. Grand, 1st Battalion Northamptonshire Regiment, attd. 2nd Trench Mortar Battery (Hanwell)
Gunner J. Green, K Battery, 7th Brigade, Royal Horse Artillery (Ipswich)
Sapper R. W. Green, 2nd Divisional Signals Company, Royal Engineers (Birmingham)
Sergeant W. Green, 1st Battalion, Middlesex Regiment (Smithfield)
Private L. Greenfield, 35th Battalion, Machine Gun Corps (E Leigh, Lancaster)
Sergeant T. F. Greenfield, 1st Battalion, Royal Warwickshire Regiment (Bow)
Sergeant S. J. Greening, 11th Battalion, Royal Fusiliers (Fulham)
Sergeant J. R. Griffin, 2/6th Battalion, Durham Light Infantry (Hull)
Sergeant G. L. Griffiths  42nd Battalion, Machine Gun Corps (Walsall)
Company Sergeant Major A. E. Groves, 4th Battalion, Yorkshire Regiment (Scarborough)
Company Sergeant Major T. J. Gudge, 9th Battalion, Machine Gun Corps (Tottenham)
Corporal F. E. Gurney, 4th Battalion, Machine Gun Corps (Margate)
Sergeant W. Guy, 5th Battalion, Yorkshire Light Infantry (Pontefract)
Private A. Haig, 1/9th Battalion, Royal Scots (Currie, Midlothian)
Driver A. B. Haines, attd. 56th Brigade, Royal Field Artillery (Lower Edmonton)
Corporal E. Haley, 203rd Field Company, Royal Engineers (Witney, Oxon.)
Sergeant E. Hall, 258th Tunnelling Company, Royal Engineers (Fulham, London)
Lance Corporal F. Hall, 1st Btn Welsh Guards (Weybridge)
Sergeant G. W. Hall, Machine Gun Corps, Machine Gun School (Forest Gate)
Sergeant J. R. Halligan, 29th Company, Labour Corps (Louth, Lincolnshire)
Sergeant S. C. Hamley, Royal Army Ordnance Corps (Luton)
Private J. E. Hammond, 3rd Squadron, Cavalry Machine Gun Corps (Northampton)
Sergeant J. H. Hammond  74th Field Company, Royal Engineers (Donegal)
Private E. Handyside, 1/7th Battalion, Durham Light Infantry (Beburn Colliery)
Corporal C. C. Hanks, 122nd Battery, 52nd Army Brigade, Royal Field Artillery (North Walsham)
Lance Sergeant W. H. Hannaford, 19th Battalion, Middlesex Regiment (Elstree)
Company Quartermaster Sergeant J. F. Harper, 9th Battalion, Highland Light Infantry (Glasgow)
Sergeant C. Harris, 216th A.T. Company, Royal Engineers (Nuneaton)
Staff Sergeant S. Harris, Royal Army Ordnance Corps, attd. 136th Siege Battery, Royal Garrison Artillery (Southampton)
Corporal B. Harrison, 11th Battalion, Durham Light Infantry (Worksop)
Sergeant T. Harrison, 2nd Battalion, Yorkshire Regiment (Rotherham)
Sapper E. W. Hart, Camn. Park Royal Engineers (Portsmouth)
Sergeant J. H. Hartshorn, 18th Battalion, Welsh Regiment (Bridgend)
Sergeant R. W. Harvey, 113th Heavy Battery, Royal Garrison Artillery (Dorchester, Wallingf ord)
Private W. Harvey, 1st Battalion, Royal Warwickshire Regiment (Coventry)
Company Sergeant Major J. Haslam, 1/5th Battalion, East Lancashire Regiment (Blackburn)
Sergeant W. Havard, D/170th Brigade, Royal Field Artillery (Wigan)
Battery Sergeant Major A. J. Hawes, 203rd Siege Battery, Royal Garrison Artillery (Stonebridge Park)
Lance Bombardier R. H. Hayes, 146th Siege Battery, Royal Garrison Artillery (South Shields)
Sergeant T. Haynes, 5th Divisional Ammunition Column, Royal Field Artillery (Athlone)
Company Sergeant Major T. H. Head, 6th Battalion, York & Lancaster Regiment (Goole)
Lance Corporal H. W. Hendy, 50th Battalion, Machine Gun Corps (Bristol)
Sergeant J. Hennessey, C/75th Brigade, Royal Field Artillery (Rhymney)
Sergeant J. Henson, 9th Battalion, Cheshire Regiment (Wandsworth)
Gunner E. A. Hicks, 456th Siege Battery, Royal Garrison Artillery (Forest Gate, London)
Sergeant W. Hillyard, 6th Battalion, King's Own Scottish Borderers (Deptford)
Sergeant G. Hilton, 5th Battalion, Cameron Highlanders (Toronto)
Company Quartermaster Sergeant D. S. Hobson, 1/5th Battalion, Liverpool Regiment (Liverpool)
Sergeant G. T. E. Hockaday, Royal Army Service Corps, attd. 79th Siege Battery, Royal Garrison Artillery (Torquay)
Private A. Hodder, 1st Battalion, Leicestershire Regiment (Loughboro)
Corporal E. J. Holden, 37th Divisional Signals Company, Royal Engineers (Farnham)
Staff Sergeant Major F. Hollington, 5th Lancers (Godmanchester)
Sergeant T. Holloway, 1/6th Battalion, South Staffordshire Regiment, attd. 137th Trench Mortar Battery (Wednesbury)
Driver G. E. Hooper, C/63rd Brigade, Royal Field Artillery (Fulham)
Company Sergeant Major R. Hopkins  5th Battalion, East Surrey Regiment (Dartford)
Battery Sergeant Major A. W. Horlock, 286th Siege Battery, Royal Garrison Artillery (Sydenham)
2nd Corporal A. A. Horwood, Royal Engineers, attd. 3rd Tank Brigade (Windsor)
Corporal T. G. Hosker, Labour Corps (late 1/5th Battalion, North Lancashire Regiment) (Bolton)
Sergeant H. C. Howard, 141st Siege Battery, Royal Garrison Artillery (Eastleigh)
Corporal R. Howarth, 18th Battalion, King's Royal Rifle Corps (Rochdale)
Company Sergeant Major J. Howes, 18th Battalion, Lancashire Fusiliers (Chadderton)
Sergeant S. Howes, 409th Siege Battery, Royal Garrison Artillery (Tulse Hill)
Sergeant J. Hoyle, 105th Field Company, Royal Engineers (Whalley, Lancaster)
Regimental Sergeant Major A. R. Hubbert, 2/4th Battalion, Hampshire Regiment (Manchester)
Sergeant J. H. Huckle D/64th Army Brigade, Royal Field Artillery (Kentish Town)
Battery Sergeant Major W. Hudson, C/246th (West Riding) Brigade, Royal Field Artillery T.F. (Sheffield)
Sergeant J. Huggan, 167th A.T. Company, Royal Engineers (Hawick)
Sergeant J. Hughes, 15th Battalion, Lancashire Fusiliers (Swinton)
Sergeant G. H. Humber, attd. 38th Brigade, Royal Field Artillery (Newport, Isle of Wight)
Company Quartermaster Sergeant J. Hunt, 2nd Battalion, Tank Corps (Bolton)
Sergeant R. Hunter, 128th Battery, 29th Brigade, Royal Field Artillery (Sheffield)
Sergeant W. J. Hunter, 2/14th Battalion, London Regiment (Harrow)
Sergeant J. Hurst, B/104th Brigade, Royal Field Artillery (Bootle, Lancaster)
Sergeant W. R. Hutton, 8th Battalion, West Yorkshire Regiment (Leeds)
Private P. Hynes, 12th Battalion, Rifle Brigade (Middlesbrough)
Corporal T. J. Ingram, 260th (Railway) Company, H.E. (Birkenhead)
Battery Quartermaster Sergeant J. R. Jackman, 37th Divisional Ammunition Column, Royal Field Artillery (Frome)
Sergeant W. Jacks, Signal Sub-Section, Royal Engineers, attd. 72nd Army Brigade, Royal Field Artillery (Brentwood)
Sergeant J. Jackson, Military Mounted Police, attd. 3rd Division (Paddington)
Company Sergeant Major J. A. Jackson, 98th Field Company, Royal Engineers (Mobberley)
Sergeant T. Jackson, 286th (West Lancaster) Brigade, Royal Field Artillery (Bamber Bridge)
Sergeant F. T. James, 12th Battalion, East Surrey Regiment (Hounslow)
Sergeant T. Jarvis, 51st Battalion, Machine Gun Corps (Sheffield)
Private P. H. Jeans, 6th Battalion, Cameron Highlanders (Inverness)
Corporal C. Jefferies, 483rd (Royal Artillery) Field Company, Royal Engineers (Brisbane, Aust.)
Sergeant G. W. Jeffery, D/51st Brigade, Royal Field Artillery (E. Greenwich)
Sergeant T. Jeffery, D/112th Brigade, Royal Field Artillery (Damdale)
Gunner W. Jenkins, 87th Siege Battery, Royal Garrison Artillery (Llandybie)
Signaller Corporal A. Johnson, 64th Battery, 5th A. Brigade, Royal Field Artillery (Glasgow)
Corporal G. E. Johnson, 2nd Battalion, Lincolnshire Regiment (Marshchapel)
Corporal J. Johnson, 1/5th Battalion, York & Lancaster Regiment (Rotherham)
2nd Corporal L. Johnson, Royal Engineers, attd. 87th Brigade, Royal Garrison Artillery (Baling, London)
Sergeant J. Johnstone, 13th Battalion, Royal Scots (Margate)
Temp Regimental Sergeant Major W. Johnstone, 9th Battalion, Durham Light Infantry (Felling-on-Tyne)
Sergeant F. Jones, T. Battery, 14th Army Brigade, Royal Horse Artillery (Birmingham)
Corporal I. E. Jones, 140th Field Ambulance, Royal Army Medical Corps (Port Talbot)
Sergeant J. Jones, 117th Heavy Battery, Royal Garrison Artillery (Llandudno)
Corporal R. Jones, 14th Battalion, Royal Welsh Fusiliers (Llandudno)
Sergeant E. Joseph, 1st Battalion, Worcestershire Regiment (Bristol)
Sergeant H. Judd, Lance 15th Brigade, Royal Horse Artillery (Southampton)
Corporal A. G. Kay, bth Battalion, North Staffordshire Regiment (Glasgow)
Corporal E. Kay, 1st Battalion, Tank Corps (Gateshead)
Sergeant N. Kehby, 65th Battery, 28th Army Brigade, Royal Field Artillery (Maryborough, Ireland)
Company Sergeant Major J. A. Kellett, 39th Battalion, Machine Gun Corps (Listerhills)
Quartermaster Sergeant W. Kelly, 3rd Battalion, Machine Gun Corps (Liverpool)
Battery Sergeant Major T. Kemp, E. Battery, Royal Horse Artillery (Hampstead)
Private V. Kempshall, 7/8th Battalion, King's Own Scottish Borderers (Manchester)
Sergeant J. Kennedy, 183rd Company, Labour Corps (Belfast)
W. A. Kent, 1/6th Battalion, Manchester Regiment (Kinsale)
Sergeant F. M. Keogan, C/110th Brigade, Royal Field Artillery (Tow Law, County Durham)
Gunner T. Kirby, C/276th (West Lancaster) Brigade, Royal Field Artillery (Lancaster)
Corporal J. Kirk, Sth Battalion, Royal Lancaster Regiment (Coldham)
Driver H. Kitehen, attd. 46th Brigade, Royal Field Artillery (Huddersfield)
Sergeant F. Knapp, 2nd Battalion, Scottish Rifles (Hackney Wick)
Sergeant A. E. J. Knight, 163rd Siege Battery, Royal Garrison Artillery (Brighton)
Sergeant H. Knight, 2nd Battalion, Royal Dublin Fusiliers, attd. Anson Battalion, Royal Naval Volunteer Reserve (Cork)
Private J. Knoble, 1st Battalion (now Depot), Royal Scots Fusiliers (Ayr)
Sergeant G. H. Laing, 19th Battalion, Northumberland Fusiliers (South Shields)
Sergeant H. T. Lamb, D/153rd Brigade, Royal Field Artillery (Stockwell, London)
Sergeant T. Lamb, 133rd Heavy Battery, Royal Garrison Artillery (Bootle, Liverpool)
Company Sergeant Major H. D. B. Land, 4/5th Battalion, Royal Highlanders (Dover)
Quartermaster Sergeant G. W. Langford, 2/3rd (East Lancaster) Field Ambulance, Royal Army Medical Corps (Manchester)
Sergeant F. Langham, No. 1 (R. Mon.) Siege Company, Royal Engineers (Hopkinstown)
Signaller Corporal W. D. Langley, 9th Lancers (Garboldieham)
Corporal H. G. Latarche, 512th (London) Field Company, Royal Engineers (Stepney Green, London)
Corporal S. J. Lathwood, 2nd Battalion, London Regiment (Catford)
Battery Sergeant Major T. Laverick, Royal Field Artillery, attd. 307th (South Midland) Brigade, Royal Field Artillery (Sunderland)
Company Sergeant Major A. E. Leach  2nd Battalion, Grenadier Guards (Wellingboro)
Sergeant E. J. Lee, 81st Siege Battery, Royal Garrison Artillery (Fulham)
Company Sergeant Major J. Leedham, 3rd Battalion, Worcestershire Regiment (Birmingham)
Lance Sergeant T. Leeming, 1/5th Battalion, Lancashire Fusiliers (Adlington)
Sergeant W. C. Lees, 352nd Siege Battery, Royal Garrison Artillery (Stoke-on-Trent)
Sergeant R. W. Legg, 493rd Siege Battery, Royal Garrison Artillery (Chaldon, near Dorchester)
Sergeant P. L. Lelliott, 119th Siege Battery, Royal Garrison Artillery (Hastings)
Corporal T. Lennox, 110th Heavy Battery, 67th Brigade, Royal Garrison Artillery (E. Glasgow)
Sergeant A. Leonard  119th Battery, 27th Brigade, Royal Field Artillery (Mildenhall)
Sergeant E. A. Leverton, 17th Battalion, Machine Gun Corps (Nottingham)
Sapper A. G. Lewis, 58th (Land.) Divisional Signals Company, Royal Engineers (Leamington Spa)
Sergeant E. Lewis, C/122nd Brigade, Royal Field Artillery (Cardiff)
Sergeant F. A. Lewis, 14th Battalion (now depot), Welsh Regiment (Swansea)
Lance Corporal F. C. V. Lewis, Military Mounted Police, attd. 42nd Division (Tylers Green, near High Wycombe)
Company Sergeant Major F. E. Lewis, 41st Battalion, Machine Gun Corps (E. Hounslow)
Sergeant G. W. Lewis, Royal Field Artillery, attd. X/59th Trench Mortar Battery (Chatham)
Company Sergeant Major H. J. Lewis  9th Battalion, Welsh Regiment (Abergavenny)
Sergeant A. Lilley, 189th Siege Battery, Royal Garrison Artillery (Hebburn, South Shields)
Sergeant J. H. C. Lindfield, attd. 112th Brigade, Royal Field Artillery (Crawley)
Corporal A. Lindley, Royal Army Service Corps, attd. 202nd Siege Battery, Royal Garrison Artillery (New Kent Rd, London)
Company Sergeant Major J. Lindon, 1/7th Battalion, Lancashire Fusiliers (Pendleton)
Sergeant F. G. Linggood, 24th Battalion, Royal Fusiliers (Walthamstow)
Corporal J. Lloyd, 2nd Battalion, Lancashire Fusiliers (Liverpool)
Acting Sergeant J. Lockhart, 9th Battalion, Royal Irish Fusiliers (Belfast)
Sergeant G. F. Long, 134th A.T. Company, Royal Engineers (Woolwich)
Sergeant C. Loomes, 1/5th Battalion, Nottinghamshire and Derbyshire Regiment (Chesterfield)
Company Sergeant Major G. H. Lovett, 1/5th Battalion, Leicestershire Regiment (Loughboro)
Corporal H. Low, 1/7th Battalion, Argyll and Sutherland Highlanders (Montrose)
Sergeant H. Lowe, C/59th Brigade, Royal Field Artillery (York)
Corporal W. Luke, 12/13th Battalion, Northumberland Fusiliers (Broompark, Durham)
Battery Sergeant Major A. Lunn, 267th Siege Battery, Royal Garrison Artillery (now 2/1st Brigade, South African R.B.) (N. Kensington)
Company Quartermaster Sergeant J. J. Lynn, 68th Field Company, Royal Engineers (Hyde Park, London)
Signaller V. Maguire, 28th Battery, 9th Brigade, Royal Field Artillery (Altrincham)
Sergeant D. O. Main, 50th Divisional Signals Company, Royal Engineers (Hull)
Sergeant T. F. W. Mallard, 120th Heavy Battery, Royal Garrison Artillery (Duston, near Northampton)
Corporal A. Malloch, 323rd Siege Battery, Royal Garrison Artillery (Glasgow)
Private A. Mallook, 1st Battalion, Royal Inniskilling Fusiliers (Dundee)
Company Sergeant Major B. J. Marlow, 78th Field Company, Royal Engineers (Hounslow)
Battery Quartermaster Sergeant B. Marmion, 10th Battalion, Scottish Rifles (Liverpool)
Gunner A. Marriott, C/91st Brigade, Royal Field Artillery (Northampton)
2nd Corporal J. S. Marshall, 25th A.T. Company, H.E. (Worcester)
Quartermaster Sergeant D. G. Martin, 98th Field Ambulance, Royal Army Medical Corps (Liverpool)
Private L. Mason  7th Battalion, East Kent Regiment (Aston, Birmingham)
Company Sergeant Major W. C. Mason, 19th Battalion, Durham Light Infantry (Shildon)
Company Sergeant Major G. R. Mathie, 12th Battalion, Royal Scots (Glasgow)
Company Sergeant Major L. A. Matthews  1st Battalion, Gordon Highlanders (Aldershot)
Sergeant F. May  1st Battalion, Royal Fusiliers (Dover)
Sergeant H. V. May  63rd (R.N.) Divisional Signals Company, Royal Engineers (Gosport)
Sergeant S. W. Maycoek, D/113th Brigade, Royal Field Artillery (Brixton, London)
Private G. Mays, 14th Battalion, Worcestershire Regiment (Hadfield)
Sergeant A. McAllister, 14th Company, Labour Corps (Steventon)
Company Sergeant Major D. McCarthy, 19th Battalion, Welsh Regiment (Cardiff)
Sergeant T. McCormack, 145th Siege Battery, Royal Garrison Artillery (Ardsallagh, County Waterford)
Sergeant J. McCullough  9th Battalion, Royal Irish Fusiliers (Portadown)
Company Sergeant Major O. McDermott, 1/6th Battalion, West Riding Regiment (Skipton)
Company Sergeant Major M. McDonald, 4th Battalion, Seaforth Highlanders (Torridon)
Battery Sergeant Major C. McDonough, attd. 86th Brigade Royal Field Artillery (Jarrow-on-Tyne)
Company Sergeant Major W. MacFarlane, 5th Battalion, Cameron Highlanders (Polton, Midlothian)
Sergeant A. Mcintire, Royal Army Service Corps, attd. 214th Siege Battery, Royal Garrison Artillery (Montrose)
Sergeant T. B. McIver, 52nd (Lowland) Divisional Signals Company, Royal Engineers (Auchterader)
Sergeant J. MacKay, 31st Divisional Signals Company, Royal Engineers (Springburn, Glasgow)
Private G. McKimm, 1st Battalion, Royal Inniskilling Fusiliers (Dover)
Regimental Sergeant Major G. McLean, 2nd Battalion, King's Own Scottish Borderers (Berwick-on-Tweed)
Sergeant D. McLeod, B/58th Brigade, Royal Field Artillery (Glasgow)
Sergeant W. McLeod, C/157th Brigade, Royal Field Artillery (Aberdeen)
Sergeant P. McNally, 529th (West Riding) Field Company, Royal Engineers (Hull)
Company Quartermaster Sergeant W. McRae, 1/5th Battalion, King's Own Scottish Borderers (Newton-Stewart)
Private A. McRobbie, 6th Battalion, Gordon Highlanders (Insch, Aberdeenshire)
Whlr. J. McWilliam, attd. 251st (N'bn) Royal Field Artillery (Hull)
Sergeant I. Meadows, 1/12th Battalion, North Lancashire Regiment (St. Helens)
Corporal A. Mennie, Royal Army Medical Corps, attd. 5/6th Battalion, Royal Scots (Aberdeenshire)
Lance Corporal A. Menzies  6th Battalion, Royal Highlanders (Aberfeldy)
Sergeant W. Michie, 1st Battalion, King's Own Scottish Borderers (Hawick)
Corporal E. W. Mildenhall, 11th Battalion, Royal Scots (Clapham)
2nd Corporal J. M. Millar, 84th Field Company, Royal Engineers (Broadloan, Renfrew)
Battery Sergeant Major J. P. Miller, 210th (East Lancaster) Brigade, Royal Field Artillery (Mary Port)
Acting Regimental Sergeant Major G. Millington, Shropshire Light Infantry, attd. 1/1st Battalion, Herefordshire Regiment (Fordesley, Salop)
Corporal P. G. Milling, 1st Battalion, Worcestershire Regiment (Weston-Turville, near Tring)
Battery Sergeant Major A. Mills, 11th Battery, Royal Field Artillery, attd. 315th (Northumberland) Army Brigade (Preston)
Sergeant W. Mills, attd. 175th Brigade, Royal Field Artillery (Tooting, London)
Company Sergeant Major V. W. Minter, 208th Field Company, Royal Engineers (Norwich)
Company Sergeant Major F. Mitchell, 6th Battalion, Cheshire Regiment (Mossley)
Gunner W. Mitchell, 83rd Battery, Royal Field Artillery, attd. Headquarters, 11th Brigade (Leith)
Sergeant E. Mogg, 127th Heavy Battery, Royal Garrison Artillery (St. George, Bristol)
Battery Quartermaster Sergeant W. Moir, 8th Battalion, Royal Highlanders (Montrose)
Sergeant C. F. Moody  8th Battalion, Royal Sussex Regiment (Crofton Park, London)
Sergeant J. Moore, 5th Battalion, South Wales Borderers (Neath)
Sergeant J. Morris, 4th Battalion, Middlesex Regiment (Kilburn, London)
Sergeant T. H. Morris, 2/4th Battalion, Oxfordshire & Buckinghamshire Light Infantry (Oxford)
Corporal W. Mothershaw, 56th Battalion, Machine Gun Corps (Newcastle)
Sergeant H. A. Moulden, D/159th Brigade, Royal Field Artillery (Haggerston)
Sergeant J. Muir, 1/6th Battalion, Argyll and Sutherland Highlanders (Neilston)
Sapper J. Mullen, 181st Tunnelling Company, Royal Engineers (Wigan)
Sapper A. Mullin, 4th Field Sur. Company, Royal Engineers (Mitchelstown)
Company Sergeant Major J. Murray, 1st Battalion, Royal Irish Rifles (Dublin)
Sergeant L. R. Naimby, 9th Battalion, Northumberland Fusiliers (Seaton Sluce)
Sergeant J. Naughton, 185th Tunnelling Company, Royal Engineers (Clown, Derby)
Company Sergeant Major H. Neilson  409th (Lowland) Field Company, Royal Engineers (Airdrie)
Sergeant W. Nelson  252nd Tunnelling Company, Royal Engineers (Hexthorpe)
Company Quartermaster Sergeant L. Neville, 1/7th Battalion, Middlesex Regiment (Hampton Hill)
Sergeant B. Newman, 12th Battalion, Somerset Light Infantry (Bournemouth)
Corporal H. Newman, 2nd Battalion, Royal Scots Fusiliers (Brighton)
Company Sergeant Major J. W. Newman, 2nd Battalion, Manchester Regiment (South Hampstead, London)
Sergeant A. J. Newnham, 9th Battalion, Royal Sussex Regiment (Dane Hill, Sussex)
Sergeant P. Nichol, 15/17th Battalion, West Yorkshire Regiment (Leeds)
Company Quartermaster Sergeant J. Nicholson, 2nd Battalion, East Lancashire Regiment (Blackburn)
Sergeant J. Noble, Sth Battalion, Seaforth Highlanders (Nairn)
Corporal A. L. Norman, 7th Battalion, Rifle Brigade, attd. 33rd Battalion, London Regiment (Forest Gate)
Company Sergeant Major J. Norton, 4th Battalion, Grenadier Guards (Battersea)
Temp Regimental Sergeant Major A. Oakham, 2/2nd Battalion, London Regiment (Fulham)
Company Sergeant Major J. O'Brien  2nd Battalion, Leinster Regiment (Cork)
Corporal H. Ormerod, C/157th Brigade, Royal Field Artillery (Burnley)
Gunner J. Orton, C/148th Brigade, Royal Field Artillery (Newcastle)
Company Sergeant Major J. Owens, 1st Battalion, attd. 2/7th Battalion, Liverpool Regiment (E. Liverpool)
Sergeant Major A. Oxley, 136th Field Ambulance, Royal Army Medical Corps (Tinsley)
Sergeant H. Page, 204th Field Company, Royal Engineers (Saws ton)
Battery Quartermaster Sergeant H. A. Page, 14th Divisional Ammunition Column, Royal Field Artillery (Faversham)
Battery Sergeant Major C. Palmer, 255th (Highland) Brigade, Royal Field Artillery (Aberdeen)
Gunner J. Palmer, attd. 95th Brigade, Royal Field Artillery (Manor Park)
Private C. J. Parker, 7th Battalion, South Staffordshire Regiment (Birmingham)
Company Quartermaster Sergeant H. Parker, 1st Battalion, Royal Lancaster Regiment (Ipswich)
Sergeant J. H. Parker, 66th (East Lancaster) Divisional Ammunition Column, Royal Field Artillery (Burnley)
Corporal W. E. Parker, 1/6th Battalion, Liverpool Regiment, attd. 165th Trench Mortar Battery (Liverpool)
Sergeant G. Parkinson, B/295th (North Midland) Brigade, Royal Field Artillery (Boston)
Company Sergeant Major R. Parry, 1/4th Battalion, Royal Lancaster Regiment (Moston)
Private H. J. Peacock, 113t Field Ambulance, Royal Army Medical Corps (Stoke-on-Trent)
Company Sergeant Major A. Pearce, 1st Battalion, Welsh Guards (Bristol)
Gunner W. Pearson, O/189th Army Brigade, Royal Field Artillery (Heaton Mersey)
Sergeant H. E. Peet, 17th Battalion, Machine Gun Corps (Peckham)
Battery Quartermaster Sergeant H. Perkins, 11th Battalion, Royal West Surrey Regiment (Wandsworth)
Sergeant J. Perkins  B/122nd Brigade, Royal Field Artillery (Bridgend)
Signaller D. Pestell, B/92nd Brigade, Royal Field Artillery (Brynmawr)
Company Quartermaster Sergeant W. Philip, 12th Battalion, Machine Gun Corps (Elgin)
Battery Quartermaster Sergeant O. J. L. Pidwell, D/190 Brigade, Royal Field Artillery (Exeter)
Company Sergeant Major G. Pine, 12th Battalion, Gloucestershire Regiment (Bristol)
Acting Bombardier J. Pinkney  attd. 112th, Brigade, Royal Field Artillery (Crook)
Battery Quartermaster Sergeant C. Pitt, 3rd Brigade, Ammn. Column Royal Horse Artillery (Newbridge, County Kildare)
Temp Regimental Sergeant Major E. C. Pittam, 2/10th Battalion, London Regiment (Woodford Green)
Company Sergeant Major H. J. Plumb, 1st Battalion, East Surrey Regiment (Putney)
Sergeant G. H. Pointon, D/155th Brigade, Royal Field Artillery (Retford)
Corporal P. R. Pontifex, Railway Operating Company, Royal Engineers (Guildford)
Bombardier A. V. Poole, attd. 62nd Brigade, Royal Field Artillery (King's Lynn)
Sergeant W. Poole, 2nd Battalion, Middlesex Regiment (Wandsworth)
Sergeant A. S. Pooley, 251st Tunnelling Company, Royal Engineers (Barncoose)
Sergeant S. J. Porter, 87th Field Company, Royal Engineers (Plaistow)
Corporal F. Prentice, Royal Field Artillery, attd. X/12th Medium Trench Mortar Battery (Belfast)
Sergeant G. D. Price, 1st Battalion, Norfolk Regiment (Poplar)
Acting Sergeant J. E. Price, 2nd Battalion, Hampshire Regiment (Brading, Isle of Wight)
Corporal W. J. Price, Sth Railway Company, Royal Engineers (Chatham)
Company Quartermaster Sergeant W. Pridding, 9th Battalion, Royal Welsh Fusiliers (Holt)
Sergeant W. Pritchard, attd. 15th Brigade, Royal Field Artillery (Cartridge, near Botley)
Company Quartermaster Sergeant W. J. C. Proctor  2nd Battalion, Seaforth Highlanders (Elgin)
Gunner W. Puddefoot, attd. 106th Brigade, Royal Field Artillery (East Ham)
Gunner J. Pybus, 142nd Siege Battery, 34th Brigade, Royal Garrison Artillery (Doncaster)
Gunner H. C. Ralph, Royal Horse Artillery, attd. HQ 4th Brigade (Caulsdon)
2nd Corporal E.Ramsay, 170th Company, Royal Engineers (E. Harrogate)
Sergeant T. Ratcliffe, 11th Battalion, East Yorkshire Regiment (Nuneaton)
Corporal J. A. Rate, 3rd Divisional Signals Company, Royal Engineers (Northampton)
Corporal H. L. Rathbone, 248th Siege Battery, Royal Garrison Artillery (Coseley, near Bilston)
Sergeant J. Rawlings, 172nd Tunnelling Company, Royal Engineers (Sheffield)
Acting Battery Sergeant Major Major W. Rawlinson, 75th Brigade, Royal Field Artillery (Rackmansworth)
Sergeant W. Rayner, 22nd Heavy Battery, Royal Garrison Artillery (Royston)
Corporal D. J. Reardon, No. 9 A. A. S. Light Section, Royal Engineers (Northfleet, London)
Private P. A. Reed, 133rd Field Ambulance, Royal Army Medical Corps (Clapham)
Mech/Staff Sergeant J. Rees, 2nd Battalion, Tank Corps (Abercynon)
Sergeant L. E. R. Reeve, 27th Battery, 32nd Brigade, Royal Field Artillery (Forest Gate, London)
Sergeant J. Reid, attd. 77th Army Bda, Royal Field Artillery (Fulham)
Sergeant J. Rigby, 2/5th Battalion, Lancashire Fusiliers (Ratcliffe)
Sapper F. Riley, 59th (North Midland) Divisional Signals Company, Royal Engineers (Newcastle, Staffs.)
Corporal G. H. T. Robbins  2nd Battalion, Devonshire Regiment, attd. 23rd Light Trench Mortar Battery (South Molton)
Company Sergeant Major D. Robertson, 1st Battalion, Tank Corps (Perth)
Sergeant D. Robertson, 206th Field Company, Royal Engineers (Limarty, Perthshire)
Sergeant L. Robinson, 74th Divisional Signals Company, Royal Engineers (Liverpool)
Farrier Staff Sergeant W. Robson, 37th Battery, 27th Brigade, Royal Field Artillery (Stoke Newington, London)
Sergeant F. Roper, 312th (West Riding) Brigade, Royal Field Artillery (Sheffield)
Company Sergeant Major A. B. Rose, XV. Corps Cyclist Battalion, Army Cyclist Corps (Oxford)
Sergeant W. Roskilly, 1st Battalion, Middlesex Regiment (Enfield)
Sergeant M. Ross, A1/87th Brigade, Royal Field Artillery (Paisley)
Sergeant J. Rowe, 1st Battalion, Border Regiment (St. Pancras)
Sergeant S. Rowe, D/161st Brigade, Royal Field Artillery (Tickhill)
Staff Sergeant Major H. Rowlatt, 4th Dragoon Guards (W. Hartiepool)
Sergeant J. Roy, 250th TunnellingCompany, Royal Engineers (Windygates, Fifeshire)
Sergeant H. Royal, 1/5th Battalion, Border Regiment (Brandon, Suffolk)
Sergeant G. Royle, 17th Battalion, Manchester Regiment (Stockport)
Company Sergeant Major F. Runcorn, 24th Battalion, Royal Fusiliers (Poplar)
Sergeant A. J. Runnacles, 46th Battery, 39th Brigade, Royal Field Artillery (N. Finchley)
Sergeant A. J. Russell  129th Battery, Royal Field Artillery (Lewisham, London)
Gunner C. R. Russell, C/77th Brigade, Royal Field Artillery (Forest Gate, London)
Battery Sergeant Major A. Sage, C/94th Brigade, Royal Field Artillery (Colchester)
Private R. Sandford, 11th Battalion, Tank Corps (Barrowford)
Sergeant W. Savage, 2/4th Battalion, South Lancashire Regiment (Warrington)
Sergeant E. A. Scarborough, 5th Battalion South Wales Borderers (Eastbourne)
Corporal T. Scott, 15th Battalion, Royal Irish Rifles, attd. 107th Light Trench Mortar Battery (Dromore, County Down)
Sergeant H. Scrivener, 2nd Battalion, Northamptonshire Regiment (Barking)
Sergeant F. W. Scutcher, 37th Battalion, Machine Gun Corps (Beckenham)
Company Sergeant Major T. U. Selway  1st Battalion, Rifle Brigade (Wimborne)
Sergeant Dr. T. P. Shepherd, 8th Battalion, Royal West Surrey Regiment (Cricklewood)
Sergeant R. J. Sheringham, 126th Heavy Battery, Royal Garrison Artillery (Guisboro, Yorkshire)
Sergeant J. W. Sherriff, 20th Battalion, Durham Light Infantry (Elano Lane, County Durham)
Company Quartermaster Sergeant J. W. Shinn (Railway) Operating Company, Royal Engineers (Munnow, Camb.)
Sergeant W. Siddle, 18th Battalion, Durham Light Infantry (Sunderland)
Sergeant W. Sigstone, 39th Battalion, Machine Gun Corps (Malton)
Company Sergeant Major A. J. Simkins, 4th Battalion, Worcestershire Regiment (Shrewsbury)
Sergeant J. N. Simmons, 8th Battalion, North Staffordshire Regiment (Brierley Hill)
Lance Corporal A. Simpson, Military Foot Police (Portsmouth)
Private T. Simpson, 2/7th Battalion, Royal Warwickshire Regiment (Birmingham)
Company Sergeant Major G. W. Sismey, 6th Battalion, Northamptonshire Regiment (Old Fletton)
Company Sergeant Major W. T. Skeer, Royal West Kent Regiment, attd. 2/20th Battalion, London Regiment (Chart)
Sergeant W. Skinner, 128th Heavy Battery, Royal Garrison Artillery (Sandridge, near St. Albans)
Private G. A. Skippen, 9th Battalion, Essex Regiment (Chelmsford)
Sergeant E. H. Skipper, 258th Siege Battery, Royal Garrison Artillery (Hoxton)
Gunner E. T. Skull, C/311th (West Riding) Army Brigade, Royal Field Artillery (Wootton Bassett)
Company Sergeant Major C. W. Slater, 1st Battalion, London Regiment (Paddington)
Company Quartermaster Sergeant F. Slaughter, 4th Battalion, Royal Sussex Regiment (Arundel)
Sergeant A. Sleight  6th Battalion, Lincolnshire Regiment (Scunthorpe)
Battery Sergeant Major G. S. Sloan, 53rd Battery, 2nd Brigade, Royal Field Artillery (Ballincollie)
Sergeant W. Slough, 12th Heavy Battery, Royal Garrison Artillery (Brockley)
Corporal G. E. Smale, 366th Siege Battery, Royal Garrison Artillery (Plymouth)
Company Sergeant Major A. G. Small, 2nd Battalion, Devonshire Regiment (Wellington)
Company Quartermaster Sergeant B. J. Smith, 19th Battalion, Machine Gun Corps (Aoton)
Sergeant E. A. Smith, 4th Battalion, Bedfordshire Regiment (Hemel Hempstead)
Company Sergeant Major G. Smith, 1/4th Battalion, East Yorkshire Regiment (Wincolmlee)
Lance Sergeant G. C. Smith, 21st Battalion, Middlesex Regiment (Worcester)
Signaller Sergeant G. D. Smith, 221st Siege Battery, Royal Garrison Artillery (Tunstall, Suffolk)
Battery Sergeant Major G. G. Smith  I. Battery, 7th Brigade, Royal Horse Artillery (Southampton)
Sergeant H. Smith, C/245th (West Riding) Brigade, Royal Field Artillery (Leeds)
Whlr. H. Smith, attd. 230th (North Midland) Brigade, Royal Field Artillery (Sutterton, Lincolnshire)
Gunner H. Smith, attd. 70th Brigade, Royal Field Artillery (Grundisburgli)
Sergeant H. S. Smith, 8th Battalion, Royal Berkshire Regiment (Kemlworth)
Sergeant J. Smith, 1/5th Battalion, Manchester Regiment (Eccleshill)
Driver J. W. Smith, B/296th (North Midland) Brigade, Royal Field Artillery (Peterborough)
Battery Sergeant Major R. B. Smith, 86th Battery, 32nd Brigade, Royal Field Artillery (Wood Green, London)
Corporal R. C. Smith, 10th Battalion, Essex Regiment (Market Harborough)
Sergeant W. Smith, 1/4th Battalion, Leicestershire Regiment (LÈcester)
Driver W. Smith, 131st Heavy Battery, Royal Garrison Artillery (Herts.)
Sergeant A. E. Snowden, 234th Field Company, Royal Engineers (Stockton-on-Tees)
Sergeant T. W. Soulsby, 35th Battalion, Machine Gun Corps (South Shields)
Company Sergeant Major A. W. Spain, 20th Battalion, King's Royal Rifle Corps (Silvertown, London)
Private J. F. Spalding, Royal Army Service Corps, attd. 25th (1/2nd Wessex) Field Ambulance, Royal Army Medical Corps (Dumfries)
Sergeant C. Sparrow, 33rd Battalion, Machine Gun Corps (Newmarket)
Sergeant W. H. Sparrow, 11th Battalion, Royal West Surrey Regiment (Lowestofit)
Sergeant J. C. Spence, 2nd Battalion, Coldstream Guards (Bayswater, London)
Farrier Sergeant W. E. Spencer, 9th Lancers (Blackwater)
Private T. J. Spooner, 13th Battalion, Royal Welsh Fusiliers (Stoke Newington)
Leading Seaman T. Stanwix, Hood Battalion, Royal Naval Volunteer Reserve (Silloth)
Sergeant C. O. Staples, Signal Service, Royal Engineers, attd. Headquarters, 89th Brigade (Wimbley)
Corporal W. Stebbing, 11th Battalion, Somerset Light Infantry (Great Yarmouth)
Company Sergeant Major F. Stembridge, 7th Battalion, West Yorkshire Regiment (Leeds)
Sergeant J. Stephens, 171st Tunnelling Company, Royal Engineers (Manchester)
Sergeant W. H. Stevens, D/173rd Brigade, Royal Field Artillery (Howden)
Sergeant W. Stevenson, 1st Battalion, Scots Guards (Bermondsey, London)
Battery Sergeant Major A. Stewart, attd. 82nd Brigade, Royal Field Artillery (Edinburgh)
Pioneer W. T. Stirling, E. Spec. Company, Royal Engineers (Bishop Briggs)
Company Sergeant Major W. Stokes, 1/8th Battalion, Nottinghamshire and Derbyshire Regiment (Old Basford, Nottinghamshire)
Sergeant L. Stone, 110th Battery, 24th Brigade, Royal Field Artillery (Swanwick)
Corporal H. R. Stow, 15th Battalion, Yorkshire Light Infantry, attd. 120th Trench Mortar Battery (Sladesgreen, Erith)
Corporal R. Strachan  256th (Highland) Brigade, Royal Field Artillery (Arbroath)
Sergeant J. C. Stredder, 439th (Cheshire) Field Company, Royal Engineers (Birkenhead)
Fitter Staff Sergeant K. Stretton, 70th Siege Battery, Royal Garrison Artillery (Fleckney, near Leicester)
Sergeant T. Strother, 141st A.T. Company, Royal Engineers (Bowsden, Berwick-on-Tweed)
Corporal G. T. Sturt, 196th Siege Battery, Royal Garrison Artillery (Pevensey Bay)
Company Quartermaster Sergeant A. A. V. Surnner, 2nd Battalion, Bedfordshire Regiment (Barking)
Acting Corporal G. E. Swift, J/5th Battalion, South Lancashire Regiment (St. Helens)
Sergeant W. G. Tallowin, attd. 110th Brigade, Royal Field Artillery (Hackney Wick, London)
Lance Bombardier T. H. Tarns, B/231st (North Midland) Brigade, Royal Field Artillery (Hanley, Staffs.)
Corporal W. Tant, 11th Battalion, Essex Regiment (Neasden)
Corporal F. A. Tarling, 131st Field Ambulance, Royal Army Medical Corps (Aberavooi)
Acting Lance Corporal A. Taylor, 341st Road Con. Company, Royal Engineers (Dorchester)
Sergeant H. Taylor, 21st Battalion, West Yorkshire Regiment (Halifax)
Sergeant Dr. S. W. Taylor, 1st Battalion, North Staffordshire Regiment (Stafford)
Private W. J. Taylor, 2nd Battalion, Royal Berkshire Regiment (Newbury)
Lance Bombardier A. Teagle, 102nd Siege Battery, Royal Garrison Artillery (Bedminster)
Sergeant J. Tenwick, B/117th Brigade, Royal Field Artillery (Blackfriars, London)
Private G.H. Thomas, 1/6th Battalion, South Staffordshire Regiment (Hednesford)
Sergeant D. P. Thomas, 9th Battalion, London Regiment (Bayswater)
Farrier Sergeant A. Thompson, B/91st Brigade, Royal Field Artillery (Bolton)
Sergeant R. Thompson, Royal Army Service Corps, attd. 71st (S.A.) Siege Battery, Royal Garrison Artillery (Saffron Walden)
Sergeant T. M. Thompson, 199th Siege Battery, Royal Garrison Artillery (Harehills)
Corporal G. Thomson, 1/5th Battalion, King's Own Scottish Borderers (Lockerbie)
Sergeant F. Thorley  2nd Battalion, Royal Welsh Fusiliers (Crewe)
Bombardier H. J. Tinsley, C/71st Brigade, Royal Field Artillery (Nottingham)
Corporal B. Tongue, 217th Siege Battery, Royal Garrison Artillery (Bristol)
Sergeant C. W. Topping, 1st Battalion, Scottish Rifles, attd. 19th Trench Mortar Battery (Kentish Town)
Company Sergeant Major A. Towner, 1st Battalion, Royal West Surrey Regiment (Hackney Wick)
Company Quartermaster Sergeant H. W. Townsend, 39th Battalion, Machine Gun Corps (Chipping Norton)
Sergeant J. W. Townsend, 1/4th Battalion, South Lancashire Regiment (Newton-le-Willows)
Sergeant E. C. Troman  2nd Battalion, Royal Welsh Fusiliers (Birmingham)
Corporal J. M. Turnbull, 184th Tunnelling Company, Royal Engineers (Edinburgh)
Sergeant B. Turner, 13th Battalion, West Riding Regiment (Chesterfield)
Battery Sergeant Major C. Turner, D/36th Brigade, Royal Field Artillery (Manchester)
Battery Sergeant Major J. W. Twilley, C/150th Brigade, Royal Field Artillery (Sheffield)
Sergeant A. Underwood, C/47th Brigade, Royal Field Artillery (Newport, Yorkshire)
Corporal G. H. Unsworth, 5th (Royal Anglesey) Field Company, Royal Engineers (E. Beaumaris)
Company Quartermaster Sergeant A. V. Unwin, 9th Battalion, Royal Welsh Fusiliers (Chirk)
Sergeant R. Ure, 1st Battalion, Scots Guards (Glasgow)
Sergeant A. Urquhart, 5th Battalion, Machine Gun Corps (Buckie)
Sergeant C. Usher, 1/14th Battalion, London Regiment (Highbury Park)
Sergeant W. E. Vagg, 17th Battalion, Northumberland Fusiliers (York)
Whlr. Corporal G. H.Vanner, B/162nd Brigade, Royal Field Artillery (Ryde, Isle of Wight)
Sergeant H. W. Vernon, 2nd Battalion, South Lancashire Regiment (Liverpool)
Sergeant W. Voisey, B/187th Brigade, Royal Field Artillery (MiUwall)
Company Sergeant Major A. Waddel, 2nd Battalion, Highland Light Infantry (Portobello)
Sergeant A. Wager, 13th Battalion, Middlesex Regiment (Wood Green, London)
Sergeant F. Wain, 2nd Battalion, Irish Guards (Rugeley)
Private S. Wakefield, 12th Battalion, Norfolk Regiment (Wisbech)
Battery Sergeant Major A. Wakelin, D/15th Brigade, Royal Field Artillery (Carrgerlane)
Company Sergeant Major F. Walker, 10th Battalion, Essex Regiment (Walthamstow)
Bombardier N. Walker, 504th Battery, 65th Brigade, Royal Field Artillery (Macclesfield)
Private C. J. Wallace, 15th Battalion, Welsh Regiment (Gilfach, Glamorgan)
Sergeant A. E. Wallington, C/170th Brigade, Royal Field Artillery (West Norwood)
Sergeant A. C. Walters, 295th (Railway) Company, Royal Engineers (Wokingham)
Gunner F. T.Walters, 227th Siege Battery, Royal Garrison Artillery (Faversham)
Sergeant T. E. Walters, 41st Battalion, Machine Gun Corps (Heaton)
Battery Sergeant Major F. H. Ward, C/83rd Brigade, Royal Field Artillery (Colchester)
Sergeant J. S. Ward, C/168th Brigade, Royal Field Artillery (Wakefield)
Sergeant A. Wardle  1st Battalion, King's Royal Rifle Corps (Birmingham)
Gunner F. Wardle, B/311th (West Riding) Brigade, Royal Field Artillery (Brighouse, Yorkshire)
Company Sergeant Major J. R. Warnchen, 2/17th Battalion, London Regiment (St. George's-in-the-East)
Battery Sergeant Major J. Warnes, D/286th (West Lancaster) Brigade, Royal Field Artillery (Wickham, Herts.)
Sergeant H. L. Warren, 1/2nd (London) Heavy Battery, Royal Garrison Artillery (Tufnell Park, London)
Battery Sergeant Major J. W. Waters, 48th Heavy Battery, Royal Garrison Artillery (Fareham)
Sergeant W. Waterworth, 427th (East Lancaster) Field Company, Royal Engineers (Ashley, Cheshire)
Corporal W. Watmough, 66th (East Lancaster) Divisional Signals Company, Royal Engineers (Hulme)
Company Sergeant Major H. R. W. Watson, 1/5th Battalion, Lancashire Fusiliers (Walker-on-Tyne)
Company Sergeant Major J. Watts, 56th Battalion, Machine Gun Corps (Buckingham)
Lance Corporal T. Watts, Military Mounted Police, attd. Headquarters, 34th Division (Chertsey)
Sergeant J. S. Webster, 147th Siege Battery, Royal Garrison Artillery (Bexhill)
Sergeant R. Weddell, 5th Battalion, Seaforth Highlanders (Edinburgh)
Sergeant A. C. Weeks  63rd Field Company, Royal Engineers (Southall, Middlesex)
Sergeant W. S. Weeks  2nd Signal Squadron, Royal Engineers (St. Helens, Isle of Wight)
Sergeant G. Wells, C/51st Brigade, Royal Field Artillery (Stockton)
Corporal J. Wenman, 29th (1st London) Divisional Signals Company, Royal Engineers (Hawkhurst)
Corporal A. P. H. Werner, C/153rd Brigade, Royal Field Artillery (Walworth)
Gunner A. G. Weston, 65th Battery, 28th Army Brigade, Royal Field Artillery (Weedon)
Sergeant A. J. White, C/48th Army Brigade, Royal Field Artillery (Acorington)
Sergeant C. White, 212th Siege Battery, Royal Garrison Artillery (Andover)
Corporal E. White, 17th Battalion, Royal Fusiliers (Shepton Mallet)
Company Sergeant Major J. White, 47th Battalion, Machine Gun Corps (E. Stirling)
Private W. White, 12th Battalion, Yorkshire Light Infantry (Harrogate)
Company Sergeant Major J. Whitfield, 9th Battalion, West Riding Regiment (Peckham)
Battery Sergeant Major C. E. Whitmill, attd. 76th Army Brigade, Royal Field Artillery (Grimsbury)
Lance Sergeant W. G. Wickens, 10th Battalion, Royal West Surrey Regiment (Crowborough)
Fitter Staff Sergeant H. Widdows, 183rd Siege Battery, Royal Garrison Artillery (Blackheath)
Company Sergeant Major E. A. Wigmore, 58th Battalion, Machine Gun Corps (Highbury)
Sergeant J. S. Wild, 155th Field Company, Royal Engineers (Glossop)
Sergeant S. R. Wilding, Royal Garrison Artillery, attd. T. A. A. Battery. (Lower Compton)
Sergeant J. L. J. Wilkins, 230th A.T. Company, Royal Engineers (Harringay, London)
Sapper H. E. Wilkinson  Signal Sub-Section, Royal Engineers, attd. 5th Army Brigade, Royal Field Artillery (Manchester)
Company Sergeant Major H. Willcock, 42nd (East Lancaster) Divisional Signals Company, Royal Engineers (Cheadle, Manchester)
2nd Corporal G. H. Wilier, 86th Field Company, Royal Engineers (Heighton, Sussex)
Sergeant E. Williams, 4th Battalion, Machine Gun Corps (Penybryn)
Company Sergeant Major F. T. Williams, 15th Battalion, Hampshire Regiment (Deptford)
Company Sergeant Major C. W. Willis, 1st Battalion, Duke of Cornwall's Light Infantry (Bodmin)
Private D. Wilson, 52nd Battalion, Machine Gun Corps (Glasgow)
Sergeant F. Wilson, 1st Battalion, East Lancashire Regiment (Bradford)
Sergeant G. Wilson  2nd Battalion, Nottinghamshire and Derbyshire Regiment (Ambergate)
Company Sergeant Major G. H. Wilson, 1/4th Battalion, Shropshire Light Infantry (Shrewsbury)
Fitter Staff Sergeant H. Wilson, l11th Siege Battery, Royal Garrison Artillery (Leeds)
Sergeant J. J. Wilson, 37th Battery, 27th Brigade, Royal Field Artillery (Barking)
Sergeant S. Wilson, 142nd Field Ambulance, Royal Army Medical Corps (Warwick)
Sergeant F. Windybank, 1st Battalion, Royal Marine Light Infantry (Manchester)
Bombardier A. Winn, 462nd Battery, 179th Brigade, Royal Field Artillery (Rawdon)
Fitter Staff Sergeant F. Winson, 114th Siege Battery, Royal Garrison Artillery (Bayswater, London)
Sergeant J. H. Wood, 1/5th Battalion, Duke of Cornwall's Light Infantry (Bude, Cornwall)
Corporal T. Wood, 1/7th Battalion, Manchester Regiment, attd. 125th Light Trench Mortar Battery (Manchester)
Company Sergeant Major A. E. Woodhams, 17th Battalion, King's Royal Rifle Corps (Clapham, London)
Corporal E. J. Woollen, 1st Field Squadron, Royal Engineers (Rochester)
Lance Corporal G. H. Woolley, 89th Field Company, Royal Engineers (Worksop)
Battery Sergeant Major C. W. Workman  Royal Garrison Artillery, attd. 270th Siege Battery, Royal Garrison Artillery (Gosport)
Private A. H. Wragg, 4th Field Aonb, Royal Army Medical Corps (Marple, Chester)
Private A. Wright, 17th Battalion, Royal Sussex Regiment (Painswick, Gloucester)
Gunner J. Wright, C/56th Brigade, Royal Field Artillery (South Shields)
2nd Corporal G. G. Wyatt, 16th Divisional Signals Company, Royal Engineers (Whitchurch, Salop)
Sergeant E. B. Wynne, 253rd Tunnelling Company, Royal Engineers (Wolstanton)
Sergeant S. York  1st Battalion, Lincolnshire Regiment (Camberwell)
Lance Corporal E. H. Young, Military Foot Police, attd. Town Commdt., Arras (Paddington)
Canadian Force
Sergeant C. W. Allbon, 13th Battalion, Canadian Railway Troops
Company Sergeant Major W. Anderson  43rd Battalion, Canadian Infantry
Sergeant L. W. Armstrong, 58th Battalion, Canadian Infantry
Sergeant J. Askew, 75th Battalion, Canadian Infantry
Sergeant D. J. Avison, 31st Battalion, Canadian Infantry
Corporal E. H. Bennett, 8th A. Brigade, Canadian Field Artillery
Corporal J. Bird, 46th.Battalion, Canadian Infantry
Sergeant W. P. Bruce, 2nd Brigade, Canadian Garrison Artillery
Sergeant L. Bouchard, 52nd Battalion, Canadian Infantry
Company Quartermaster Sergeant D. Callander, 18th Battalion, Canadian Infantry
Regimental Sergeant Major T. Carroll, 38th Battalion, Canadian Infantry
Sergeant W. D. Connell, 58th Broad Gauge Railway Operating Company
Company Sergeant Major J. L. Davies  42nd Battalion, Canadian Infantry
Sergeant J. W. Bobbie, 54th Battalion, Canadian Infantry
Sergeant F. Dow, 13th Brigade, Canadian Field Artillery
Regimental Sergeant Major H. Endall  26th Battalion, Canadian Infantry
Sergeant W. Fettus  4th Battalion, Canadian Engineers
2nd Corporal G. Fielding, 2nd Canadian Divisional Signals Company, Canadian Engineers
Sergeant A. I. Fleck, 14th Brigade, Canadian Field Artillery
Driver W. R. Flinn, 4th Canadian Pont. Brigade, Canadian Engineers
Sergeant S. Fowler, 25th Battalion, Canadian Infantry
Company Sergeant Major J. Foy, Royal Canadian Regiment
Sergeant G. Gardner, 4th Battalion, Canadian Infantry
Corporal G. W. Gazeley, 1st Canadian Works Company
Corporal E. W. George  29th Battalion, Canadian Infantry
Lance Sergeant W. A. Gilbert, 1st Battalion, Canadian Mounted Rifles
Company Sergeant Major W. R. Goodchild, 4th Battalion, Canadian Mounted Rifles
Sergeant V. Goodman, 4th Battalion, Canadian Machine Gun Corps
Company Quartermaster Sergeant E. R. Goucher, 5th Battalion, Canadian Engineers
Battery Quartermaster Sergeant E. Greer, 1st Battalion, Canadian Infantry
Private E. W. Ball, Canadian Motor Machine Gun Brigade, M.T. Company, Canadian Army Service Corps
Sergeant G. P. Hearnden, 102nd Battalion, Canadian Infantry
Battery Quartermaster Sergeant H. Higgins, 6th Brigade, Canadian Field Artillery
Corporal G. N. Howe, 47th Battalion, Canadian Infantry
Sergeant D. Hunt, 3rd Battalion, Canadian Railway Troops
Sergeant D. Irons, 49th Battalion, Canadian Infantry
Sergeant C. Off. H. Jeeves, 10th Battalion, Canadian Infantry
Corporal G. H. Johnston, 1st Battalion, Canadian Railway Troops
Sergeant W. Kemp, 1st Brigade, Canadian Garrison Artillery
Sergeant D. Kerr, 2nd Battalion, Canadian Engineers
Battery Quartermaster Sergeant J. H. King, 52nd Battalion, Canadian Infantry
Private E. T. Lockhart, 10th Canadian Field Ambulance, Canadian Army Medical Corps
Sergeant S. G. Mallindine, 2nd Canadian Motor Machine Gun Brigade
Battery Sergeant Major F. R. H. Marshall, 2nd Brigade, Canadian Field Artillery
Sergeant R. S. Marston, 2nd Battalion, Canadian Mounted Rifles, attd. 1st Ontario Regiment
Gunner J. A. MacDonald, 9th Brigade, Canadian Field Artillery
Acting Corporal K. J. McDonald, Canadian Regiment, attd. 3rd Brigade, Canadian Garrison Artillery
Sergeant T. MacDonald, 87th Battalion, Canadian Infantry
Sergeant J. H. MacFarlane, 9th Canadian Field Ambulance, Canadian Army Medical Corps
Sergeant W. B. Mackie, 20th Battalion, Canadian Infantry
Sergeant J. F. MacLean. 13th Battalion, Canadian Infantry
Bombardier V. G. Mew, 2nd Canadian Division Trench Mortar Battery
Battery Quartermaster Sergeant P. J. Murphy, Royal Canadian Horse Artillery
Sergeant J. R. Murray, 85th Battalion, Canadian Infantry
Corporal J. Myles, 1st Canadian Division, Trench Mortar Battery
Sergeant A. Nauffts, 25th Battalion, Canadian Infantry
Lance Corporal G. W. O'Reilly, Fort Garry Horse
Sergeant J. C. Parish, 50th Battalion, Canadian Infantry
Company Sergeant Major W. G. Powers, 58th Battalion, Canadian Infantry
Army Staff Sergeant H. Ruddick, 1st Battalion, Canadian Machine Gun Corps
Sergeant H. Russell, 6th Brigade, Canadian Field Artillery
Sergeant J. B. Rust, 2nd Battalion, Canadian Machine Gun Corps
Sergeant J. Rycroft  3rd Brigade, Canadian Field Artillery
Acting Staff Sergeant H. Scott, Canadian O.C., attd. 7th Canadian Sge Battery
Company Sergeant Major F. C. Sims, 78th Battalion, Canadian Infantry
Private A. B. Smith, 14th Battalion, Canadian Infantry
Sergeant B. B. Smith, 4th Battalion, Canadian Infantry
Regimental Sergeant Major W. Smylie, Headquarters, 1st Brigade, Canadian Engineers
Sergeant F. A. Southcott, 8th A. Brigade, Canadian Field Artillery
Corporal A. E. Speare, 20th Battalion, Canadian Infantry
Company Sergeant Major C. Spurgeon, Princess Patricia's Canadian Light Infantry
Battery Sergeant Major P. H. Stanley, 10th Brigade, Canadian Field Artillery
Sergeant F. Stock, 3rd Canadian Pont. Brigade, T.U., Canadian Engineers
Battery Quartermaster Sergeant S. G. Stoddart, 8th Battalion, Canadian Infantry
Battery Sergeant Major P. Studdert, 4th Brigade, Canadian Field Artillery
Sergeant L. B. Taylor, E. Battery, Canadian A.A. Craft, Canadian Field Artillery
Battery Sergeant Major P. Thome  2nd Divisional Ammunition Column, Canadian Field Artillery
Corporal H. Tomlinson, 2nd Canadian Mounted Rifles (B.C.)
Company Quartermaster Sergeant J. G. Waterfield, 1st Canadian Divisional Signals Company, Canadian Engineers
Sergeant J. C. Wherrett  44th Battalion, Canadian Infantry
Sergeant J. C. Wilson, 2nd Canadian Mounted Rifles (B.C.)
Corporal J. Winters, Signal Troops, Canadian Engineers, Canadian Cavalry Brigade
Sergeant G. A. Young, 72nd Battalion, Canadian Infantry
Australian Force
Sergeant H. I. Andrews, 4th Battalion, Australian Machine Gun Corps
Company Sergeant Major H. Anson, 55th Battalion, Australian Infantry
Staff Sergeant G. R. Asprey, 1st Australian Supp. Det., Australian Army Service Corps
Private W. H. Baker, 1st Battalion, Australian Machine Gun Corps
Lance Corporal J. Barrett, 1st Australian Pioneer Battalion
Sergeant W. H. D. Beadle, 3rd Australian Divisional Ammunition Column, Australian Field Artillery
Corporal V. J. Bean, 1st Divisional Train, Australian Army Service Corps
Sergeant W. A. Birchmore, 4th Brigade, Australian Field Artillery
Company Sergeant Major C. A. Boyd, 1st Australian Divisional Train, Australian Army Service Corps
Sergeant N. W. Cairns, 37th Battalion, Australian Infantry
Sergeant W. S. Cannan, 13th Brigade, Australian Field Artillery
Company Quartermaster Sergeant F. O. Cavanagh, 11th Battalion, Australian Infantry
Regimental Sergeant Major L. Collins, 14th Battalion, Australian Infantry
Sergeant T. S. Daniels, 12th A. Brigade, Australian Field Artillery
Corporal C. Davies, 6th A. Brigade, Australian Field Artillery
Company Sergeant Major G. L. W. Dfeacon, 7th Battalion, Australian Infantry
Corporal R. W. Druery, 3rd Battalion, Australian Infantry
Sergeant R. A. Fuller, 12th Lieutenant Australian Trench Mortar Battery
Sergeant W. Furniss, 13th Field Artillery Brigade, Australian Field Artillery
Company Sergeant Major H. W. Furze, 32nd Battalion, Australian Infantry
Sergeant H. Gillam, 40th Battalion, Australian Infantry
Sergeant A. L. Greenwood, 45th Battalion, Australian Infantry
Corporal J. Hall, 7th Lieutenant Australian Trench Mortar Battery
Corporal C. R. Harvey, 3rd Lieutenant Australian Trench Mortar Battery
Corporal F. W. T. Helmore, 1st (Med.) Australian Trench Mortar Battery
Sergeant S. Hooper, 16th Battalion, Australian Infantry
Regimental Sergeant Major R. Jenkyn, 2nd Brigade, attd. HQ Australian Field Artillery
Private J. Jensen, 33rd Battalion, Australian Infantry
Company Sergeant Major F. S. Jones, 54th Battalion, Australian Infantry
Company Sergeant Major F. G. Jurd, 5th Australian Pioneer Battalion
Lance Corporal F. C. Kingston, 11th Battalion, Australian Infantry
Sergeant A. Locke, 3rd A. Brigade, Australian Field Artillery
Corporal H. D. Lonie, 3rd Australian Phr. Battalion
Sergeant O. J. Looney, 39th Battalion, Australian Infantry
Sergeant C. H. Lorking, 53rd Battalion, Australian Infantry
Company Sergeant Major T. W. Marriott, 50th Battalion, Australian
Sergeant R. H. Mathews, 30th Battalion, Australian Infantry
Sergeant D. Macauley, 44th Battalion, Australian Infantry
Corporal R. McCann, 4th Australian Division M.T. Company, Australian Army Service Corps, attd. 13th Australian Field Ambulance
Company Sergeant Major T. H. McColl  2nd Battalion, Australian Infantry
Sergeant A. McDonald, 17th Battalion, Australian Infantry
Sergeant J. M. McDonald, 9th Battalion, Australian Infantry
Battery Sergeant Major K. W. C. McEntyre, 3rd A. Brigade, Ammunition Column, Australian Field Artillery
Gunner T. McLean, 14th Field Artillery Brigade, Australian Field Artillery
Corporal C. O. McLear, 24th Battalion, Australian Infantry
Company Sergeant Major F. V. McPhee, 34th Battalion, Australian Infantry
Sergeant F. R. Philpot, 6th Battalion, Australian Infantry
Company Sergeant Major P. Robertson, 4th Battalion, Australian Infantry
Sergeant J. C. Ross, 29th Battalion, Australian Infantry
Sergeant T. Ross, 1st Australian Light Gauge Railway Operating Company, Australian Engineers
Corporal T. Ryan, 43rd Battalion, Australian Infantry
Sergeant J. S. H. Semple, 21st Battalion, Australian Infantry
Corporal A. W. H. Slater, 3rd Australian Divisional Salvage Company, Australian Army Service Corps
Corporal J. B. Stark, 3rd Australian Medium Trench Mortar Battery, Australian Field Artillery
Sergeant A. S. Thomson, 1st Tunnelling Company, Australian Engineers
Sergeant J. R. Trotman, 49th Battalion, Australian Infantry
Sergeant A. L. Tully  3rd Australian Divisional Signals Company, Australian Engineers
Corporal L. T. Whitmore, 5th Battalion, Australian Machine Gun Corps
Sergeant F. C. Wicks, 1st Field Company, Australian Engineers
Sergeant C. C. Wills, 6th A. Brigade, Australian Field Artillery
New Zealand Force
Sergeant F. Barclay, New Zealand Maori Pioneer Battalion
Sergeant A. I. Batty, 2nd Battalion, 3rd New Zealand (R.) Regiment
Sergeant F. H. Clifford, New Zealand Tunnelling Company, New Zealand Engineers
Corporal A. Dunlop, 2nd Battalion, Otago Regiment
Sergeant W. L. Free, 1st Battalion, 3rd New Zealand (R.) Regiment
Sergeant G. Hatch, New Zealand Tunnelling Company, New Zealand Engineers
Battery Sergeant Major J. P. Joyce, 6th Battery, 2nd A. Brigade, New Zealand Field Artillery
Corporal E. Kelly, 2nd Battalion, Canterbury Regiment
Sapper K. B. McLean, New Zealand Tunnelling Company, New Zealand Engineers
Sergeant A|C. Mills, 1st Battalion, Otago Regiment
Sergeant T. Muir, 2nd Battalion, Wellington Regiment
Sergeant W. A. Proctor, 2nd Battalion, Auckland Regiment
Private F. A. Stade, New Zealand Machine Gun Corps
Sergeant J. Tannahill, 1st Battalion, Wellington Regiment
Sergeant N. B. Thompson, 1st Battalion, Canterbury Regiment
Sergeant L. Tribe, 1st Battalion, Auckland Regiment
Sergeant C. Wilson, 1st Battalion, 3rd New Zealand
South African Force
Company Quartermaster Sergeant M. King, 2nd Battalion, South African Infantry
Sergeant W. N. Sinclair  74th R. Siege Battery, Royal Garrison Artillery (South African Horse Artillery)

Newfoundland Force
Acting Company Quartermaster Sergeant W. Haynes, 1st Battalion, R. (R.) Royal Newfoundland Regiment

Awarded a Bar to the Distinguished Conduct Medal (DCM*) 

In connection with Military Operations with the Armies in France:
Sergeant J. S. Bastick  7th Battalion, Norfolk Regiment, attd. 35th Trench Mortar Battery (Bethnal Green) 
Company Sergeant Major F. A. Savage  8th Battalion, Gloucestershire Regiment (Thrupp)
Sergeant A. Wilbur  1/5th Battalion, Leicestershire Regiment (Hinckley)

Australian Imperial Force
Sergeant S. Collett  58th Battalion, Australian Infantry
Company Sergeant Major J. McD. McCash,  59th (late 60th) Battalion, Australian Infantry

References

New Year Honours
1919 awards
1919 in Australia
1919 in Canada
1919 in India
1919 in New Zealand
1919 in the United Kingdom